= 2024 United States presidential election =

Second election of Donald Trump

- November 5, 2024

538 members of the Electoral College 270 electoral votes needed to win
- Opinion polls
- Turnout: 64.3% (▼2.3 pp)

Nominee	Donald Trump	Kamala Harris
Party	Republican	Democratic
Home state	Florida	California
Running mate	JD Vance	Tim Walz
Electoral vote	312	226
States carried	31 + ME-02	19 + DC + NE-02
Popular vote	77,302,580	75,017,613
Percentage	49.8%	48.3%
- Presidential election results map. Red denotes states won by Trump/Vance and blue denotes those won by Harris/Walz. Numbers indicate electoral votes cast by each state and the District of Columbia.
President before election
Joe Biden
Democratic
Elected President
Donald Trump
Republican

A presidential election was held in the United States on November 5, 2024. The Republican ticket of former president Donald Trump and Ohio junior senator JD Vance defeated the Democratic ticket of incumbent vice president Kamala Harris and Minnesota governor Tim Walz.

The incumbent president, Joe Biden of the Democratic Party, initially ran for re-election, easily defeating a challenge from representative Dean Phillips of Minnesota in the Democratic primaries to become the party's presumptive nominee. However, what was broadly considered a poor debate performance in June 2024 intensified concerns about his age and health, and led to calls within his party for him to leave the race. After initially declining to do so, Biden ultimately withdrew on July 21, 2024, becoming the first eligible incumbent president to run but subsequently withdraw since Lyndon B. Johnson in 1968. Biden immediately endorsed Harris, who officially became the party's presidential nominee on August 5 and the first presidential nominee who did not participate in the primaries since Vice President Hubert Humphrey in 1968. Harris selected Walz as her running mate.

Trump, who lost the 2020 presidential election to Biden, ran for reelection to a nonconsecutive second term. Trump became the presumptive Republican nominee on March 12, 2024, easily defeating challengers including former South Carolina governor Nikki Haley and Florida governor Ron DeSantis in the Republican primaries. He was shot in the ear in an assassination attempt on July 13, 2024. Trump was nominated as the Republican Party's presidential candidate during the 2024 Republican National Convention alongside his running mate, JD Vance. The Trump campaign ticket supported mass deportation of illegal immigrants; (Note: While Trump's proposed deportation program primarily targeted illegal immigrants, he also pledged to displace legal immigrants.) an isolationist "America First" and "peace through strength" foreign policy agenda with support of Israel in the Gaza war and skepticism of Ukraine in its war with Russia; policies hostile to transgender Americans; and greatly increased import tariffs. The campaign also made false and misleading statements, including claims of electoral fraud in 2020. Historians and some former Trump administrators saw his political movement as authoritarian.

Trump won the election over Harris, with 312 Electoral College votes to Harris's 226. Trump won all of the top seven swing states, including Nevada for the Republicans' first time since 2004. Trump won the national popular vote with a plurality of 49.8%, making him the first Republican to win the popular vote since George W. Bush in 2004 (unlike his 2016 victory and 2020 defeat). Trump's victory made him the second U.S. president to be elected to a nonconsecutive second term, after Grover Cleveland in 1892. Surveys of 2024 election voters, nationally and in key states, found that many viewed economic conditions negatively and were motivated by the issue when they voted. Other issues that motivated voters included immigration, the state of democracy, and abortion.

== Background ==
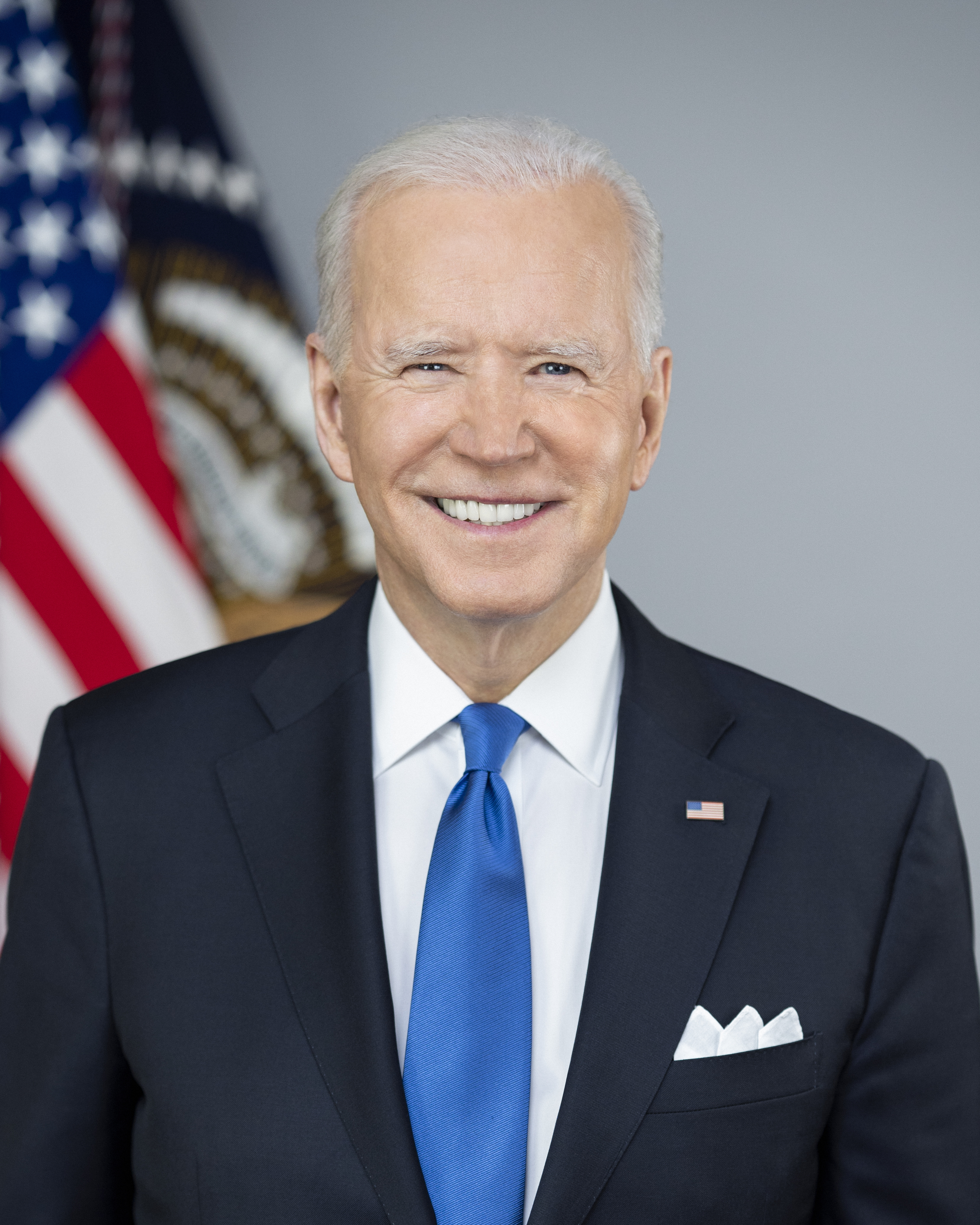
Joe Biden, the incumbent president in 2024, whose term expired at noon on January 20, 2025

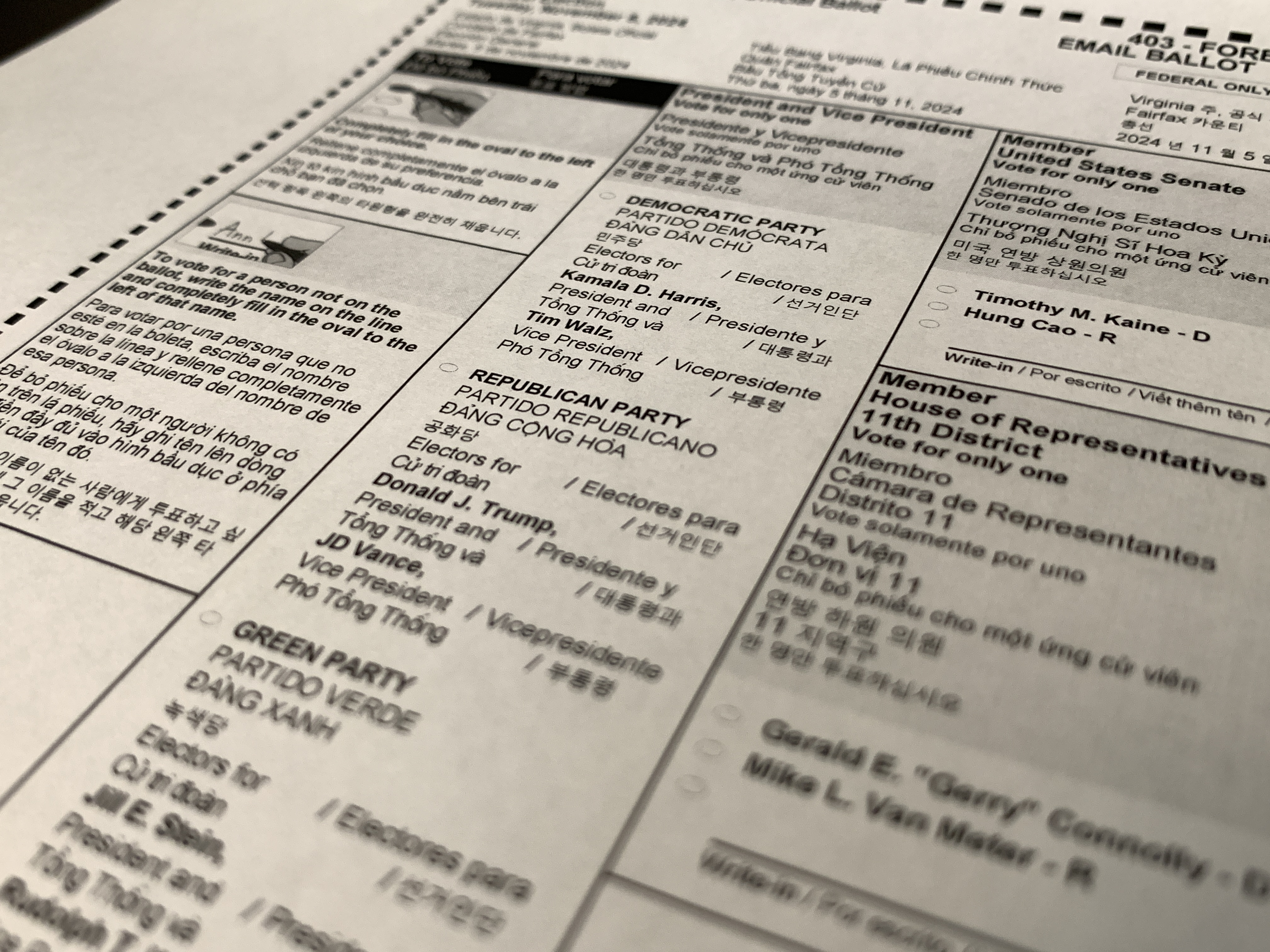
A general election absentee ballot from Fairfax County, Virginia, listing the presidential and vice presidential candidates

In 2020, incumbent Republican President Donald Trump sought re-election but was defeated by Democratic challenger Joe Biden. Democratic U.S. Senator Kamala Harris of California was elected vice president in 2020 as Biden's running mate.

Trump is the first president in American history to be impeached twice and run for president again after impeachment. As Trump was acquitted by the Senate in both cases, he was not barred from seeking reelection to the presidency in 2024.

=== Election interference ===
Several state courts and officials, including the Colorado Supreme Court, a state Circuit Court in Illinois, and the Secretary of State of Maine, ruled that Trump was ineligible to hold office under Section 3 of the Fourteenth Amendment to the United States Constitution for his role in the January 6 Capitol attack, and thus attempted to disqualify him from appearing on the ballot. These attempts were unsuccessful. On March 4, 2024, the U.S. Supreme Court unanimously ruled in Trump v. Anderson that states cannot determine eligibility for a national election under Section 3. The Court held that only Congress has the authority to disqualify candidates, or to pass legislation that allows courts to do so.

==== Donald Trump's false claims of interference ====
To sow election doubt, Trump escalated use of "rigged election" and "election interference" statements in advance of the 2024 election compared to the previous two elections.

Trump made false claims of voter fraud in the 2020 presidential election and denied the validity of the election results. In July 2024, The New York Times reported that "the Republican Party and its conservative allies are engaged in an unprecedented legal campaign targeting the American voting system", by restricting voting for partisan advantage ahead of Election Day and preparing to mount "legally dubious" challenges against the certification process if Trump were to lose.

In the lead-up to the 2024 election, the Republican Party made false claims of massive "noncitizen voting" by immigrants in an attempt to delegitimize the election in the event of a Trump defeat. The claims were made as part of larger efforts within the Republican Party to disrupt the 2024 election and promote election denial. Trump and several other Republicans stated that they would not accept the results of the 2024 election if they believed they were "unfair".

Trump's previous comments suggesting he could "terminate" the Constitution to reverse his election loss, his claim that he would only be a dictator on "day one" of his presidency and not afterwards, his promise to use the Justice Department to go after his political enemies, his plan to use the Insurrection Act of 1807 to deploy the military for law enforcement in primarily Democratic cities and states, attempts to overturn the 2020 United States presidential election, his baseless predictions of voter fraud in the 2024 election, and his public embrace and celebration of the January 6 United States Capitol attack, raised concerns over the state of democracy in the United States. Trump's political operation said that it planned to deploy more than 100,000 attorneys and volunteers to polling places across battleground states, with an "election integrity hotline" for poll watchers and voters to report alleged voting irregularities.

==== Interference by foreign nations ====
Before the election, U.S. officials and former officials stated that foreign interference in the 2024 election was likely. Three major factors cited were "America's deepening domestic political crises, the collapse of controversial attempts to control political speech on social media, and the rise of generative AI". China, Russia, and Iran were identified as mounting influence operations and attempts to interfere with the 2024 election. U.S. intelligence officials described the efforts as part of broader efforts by authoritarian nations to use the internet to erode support for democracy.

===== China =====
China was identified as interfering with the 2024 election through propaganda and disinformation campaigns linked to its Spamouflage operation. U.S. intelligence agencies described the effort as not targeting any particular candidate but focusing on issues important to the Chinese government, such as Taiwan, and "undermining confidence in elections, voting, and the U.S. in general". As early as April 1, 2024, The New York Times reported that the Chinese government had created fake pro-Trump accounts on social media "promoting conspiracy theories, stoking domestic divisions and attacking President Biden ahead of the election in November".

===== Russia =====
According to disinformation experts and intelligence agencies, Russia spread disinformation ahead of the 2024 election to damage Biden and Democrats, boost candidates supporting isolationism, and undercut support for Ukraine aid and NATO. On September 4, 2024, the United States publicly accused Russia of interfering in the 2024 election and announced several steps to combat Russian influence including sanctions, indictments, and seizing of web domains used to spread propaganda and disinformation. U.S. intelligence agencies assessed that Russia preferred Trump to win the election, viewing him as more critical of American support for Ukraine.

===== Iran =====
The Islamic Republic of Iran was identified as interfering with the 2024 presidential election through front companies connected to the Islamic Revolutionary Guard Corps and hacking attempts against the Trump, Biden, and Harris campaigns starting as early as May 2024. The Iranian regime launched propaganda and disinformation campaigns through fake news websites and accounts on social media to tip the election against former president Trump. The New York Times stated the efforts were an attempt at "sowing internal discord and discrediting the democratic system in the United States more broadly in the eyes of the world."

=== Voter roll purges ===
Multiple Republican-led administrations removed voters from their states' voter rolls in the lead up to the election, which critics argued violates the National Voter Registration Act. In July 2024, 160,000 inactive or infrequent voters were removed from Ohio's voter rolls. The Ohio chapters of Common Cause and the League of Women Voters threatened lawsuits against the state over the purge.

In August 2024, Governor Glenn Youngkin of Virginia signed an executive order removing 6,303 voters suspected of being non-citizens from Virginia's voter rolls. In October 2024, the U.S. Department of Justice sued the Virginia Board of Elections and Virginia commissioner of elections over the voter purge, alleging that it violated the National Voter Registration Act. The suit also found a number of alleged non-citizens purged were actually citizens. District judge Patricia Tolliver Giles ruled that the removal was illegal, ordering the state to stop purging voter rolls and to restore the voter registration of more than 1,600 voters who had been removed. The 4th Circuit Court of Appeals then upheld the order. The administration filed an emergency appeal to the U.S. Supreme Court, which sided with Virginia in a 6–3 decision along ideological lines, allowing the state to continue purging voter rolls.

In August 2024, Alabama Secretary of State Wes Allen announced a process for purging 3,251 registered Alabama voters and referred them to the state attorney general's office for criminal prosecution. In September 2024, the Department of Justice sued Alabama for violating the National Voter Registration Act. In October 2024, district judge Anna Manasco ruled in favor of the Department of Justice, ordering the state to restore the voter registrations. Alabama secretary of state's chief of staff Clay Helms testified that 2,000 of the purged voters were legally registered citizens.

=== Criminal and civil legal proceedings involving Donald Trump ===
Trump was the subject of various criminal and civil legal proceedings before and during his 2024 re-election campaign. Specifically, Trump was found liable in a civil proceeding for financial fraud in 2023, was found liable for both sexual abuse and defamation in 2023, and was found liable for defamation in a related civil proceeding in 2024. In 2024, Trump was criminally convicted of 34 felonies related to falsifying business records. Trump and other Republicans made numerous false and misleading statements regarding Trump's various legal proceedings, including false claims that they were "rigged" or consisted of "election interference" orchestrated by Biden and the Democratic Party.

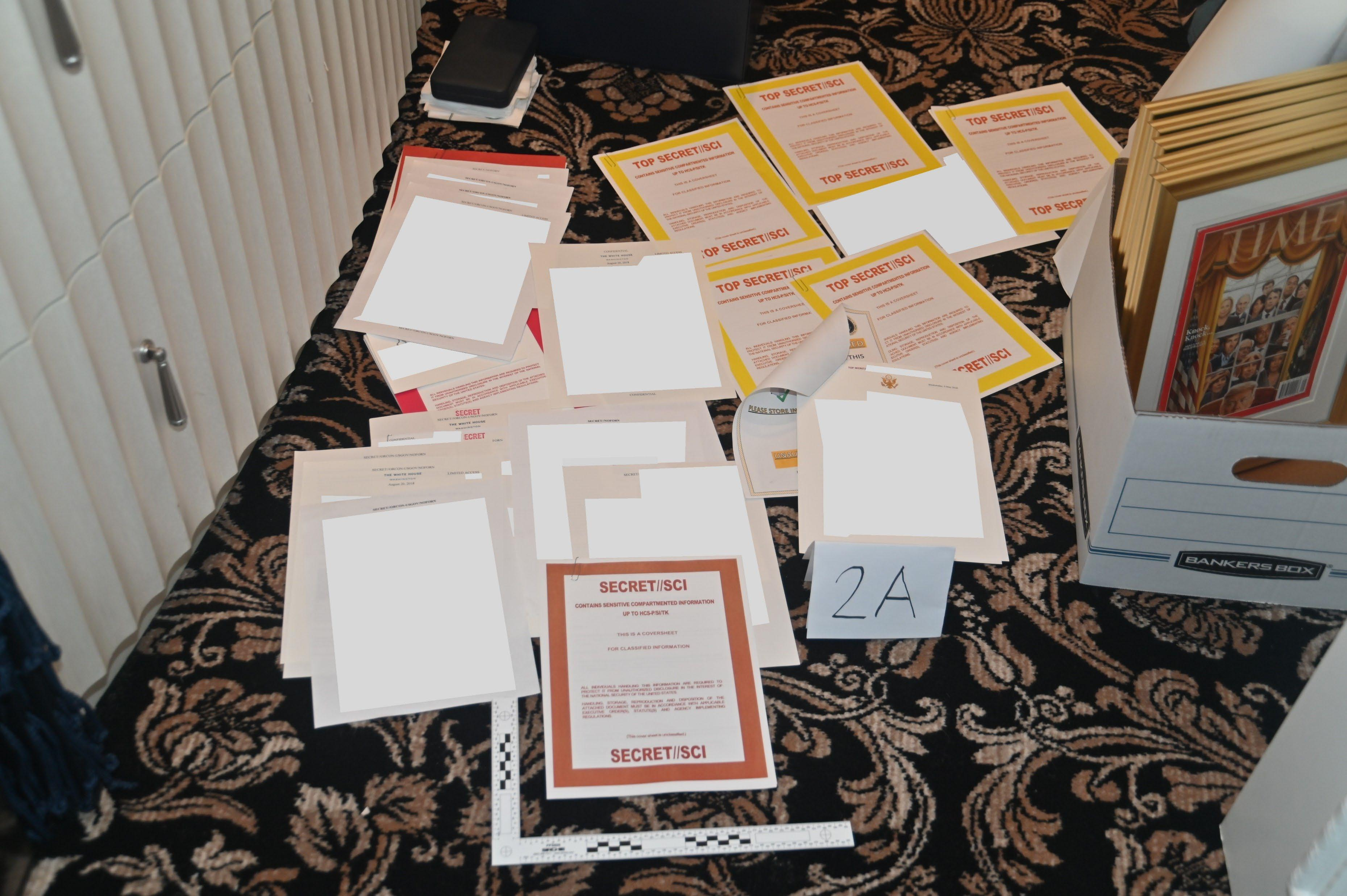
Classified intelligence material found inside Mar-a-Lago in 2022

On May 30, 2024, Trump was found guilty by a jury of all 34 felony counts in The People of the State of New York v. Donald J. Trump. The jury found that Trump falsified business records relating to hush money payments made to pornographic film star Stormy Daniels to ensure her silence about a sexual encounter between them. This conviction made Trump the first former U.S. president to be convicted of a crime. On January 10, 2025, Trump was given a no-penalty sentence known as an unconditional discharge.

Trump faced other criminal charges as well. In United States of America v. Donald J. Trump, Trump faced four criminal counts for his alleged role in attempting to overturn the 2020 United States presidential election and involvement in the January 6 United States Capitol attack; the case was dismissed following Trump's re-election in November 2024. In The State of Georgia v. Donald J. Trump, et al., Trump was charged with eight criminal counts for his alleged attempts to overturn the results of the 2020 United States presidential election in Georgia. District Attorney Fani Willis was disqualified from prosecuting the case; Willis has appealed that decision. In United States of America v. Donald J. Trump, Waltine Nauta, and Carlos De Oliveira, Trump faced 40 criminal counts relating to his hoarding of classified documents and alleged obstruction of efforts to retrieve them; the case was dismissed in July 2024.

On May 9, 2023, in E. Jean Carroll v. Donald J. Trump, an anonymous jury found Trump civilly liable for sexual abuse and defamation, and ordered him to pay Carroll $5 million in damages. In a related case brought by Carroll against Trump, a jury awarded Carroll $83.3 million. As of April 2025, appeals were ongoing in both cases.

In September 2023, Trump was found civilly liable for financial fraud in New York v. Trump. In February 2024, he was ordered to pay a $354.8 million fine, together with approximately $100 million in interest. As of January 29, 2025, an appeal was ongoing.

Trump made efforts to delay his trials until after the 2024 election. On July 1, 2024, the Supreme Court delivered a 6–3 decision in Trump v. United States, ruling that Trump had absolute immunity for acts he committed as president within his core constitutional purview, at least presumptive immunity for official acts within the outer perimeter of his official responsibility, and no immunity for unofficial acts.

=== Age and health concerns ===
==== Joe Biden ====
Mass media, lawmakers, and Donald Trump raised concerns about Biden's age, including his cognitive state, during and after the 2020 United States presidential election. According to a February 2024 poll, Biden's age and health were major or moderate concerns for 86% of voters generally, up from 76% in 2020. According to another February 2024 poll, most of those who voted for Biden in 2020 believed he was too old to be an effective president; The New York Times noted that these concerns "cut across generations, gender, race and education".

Concerns about Biden's age and health increased after a poor performance by Biden during a debate against Trump in June 2024. That performance led a number of commentators and Democratic lawmakers to call for Biden to drop out of the 2024 presidential race. In July 2024, Biden ultimately withdrew from the race while stating that he would continue serving as president until the conclusion of his term.

==== Donald Trump ====
In the summer before the election, polling showed at least half of Americans thought that Trump, who was 78 years old, was too old to serve a second term, with 80% unsure he would be able to finish out a second term. Numerous public figures, media sources, and mental health professionals speculated that Trump may have some form of dementia, which runs in his family. Experts for the science publication STAT who analyzed changes in Trump's speeches between 2015 and 2024 noted shorter sentences, more tangents, more repetition, and more confusion of words and phrases. Doctors suggested these changes could relate to Trump's moods or could indicate the beginning of Alzheimer's. One expert noted an increase in expressions of all-or-nothing thinking by Trump; a sharp rise in all-or-nothing thinking is also linked to cognitive decline. The New York Times reported that Trump's 2024 speeches had grown "darker, harsher, longer, angrier, less focused, more profane and increasingly fixated on the past", and that experts considered this increase in tangential speech and behavioral disinhibition as a possible consequence of advancing age and cognitive decline. Trump was also criticized for his lack of transparency around his medical records and health.

=== Violent rhetoric ===
On July 14, Biden gave an address condemning political violence, including the attempted assassination of Trump, arguing for the need to "lower the temperature" in American politics.

Several scholars, lawmakers, intelligence agencies, and the members of the public expressed concerns about political violence surrounding the 2024 election. The fears came amidst increasing threats and acts of physical violence targeting public officials and election workers at all levels of government. Trump was identified as a key figure in increasing political violence in the United States both for and against him. Political violence was at its highest since the 1970s, and the most recent violence came from right-wing assailants. Trump increasingly embraced far-right extremism, conspiracy theories such as Q-Anon, and far-right militia movements to a greater extent than any modern American president. Trump also espoused dehumanizing, combative, and violent rhetoric, and promised retribution against his political enemies. Trump played down but refused to rule out violence following the 2024 election, stating "it depends". Trump also suggested using the military against "the enemy from within" on Election Day that he described as "radical left lunatics", Democratic politicians, and those opposed to his candidacy.

== Nominations ==
=== Republican Party ===
Results of the 2024 Republican presidential primaries. Trump (blue) won everything but Vermont and Washington D.C., which went to Nikki Haley (orange).

Trump filed and announced his candidacy a week following the 2022 midterm elections. Trump was considered an early frontrunner for the Republican presidential nomination. He had announced in March 2022 that his former vice president Mike Pence would not be his running mate.

Trump faced opposition in the primaries. Florida Governor Ron DeSantis was initially viewed as the main challenger to Trump for the Republican nomination, having raised more campaign funds in the first half of 2022 and posting more favorable polling numbers than Trump by the end of 2022. On May 24, 2023, DeSantis announced his candidacy on Twitter in an online conversation with the social media company's CEO, Elon Musk. At the end of July 2023, FiveThirtyEight's national polling average of the Republican primaries had Trump at 52 percent, and DeSantis at 15.

Following the Iowa caucuses, in which Trump posted a landslide victory, DeSantis and businessman Vivek Ramaswamy dropped out of the race and endorsed Trump, leaving the former president and Nikki Haley, the former South Carolina governor who served in Trump's cabinet, as the only remaining major candidates. Trump continued to win all four early voting contests while Haley's campaign struggled to gain momentum. On March 6, 2024, the day after winning only one primary out of fifteen on Super Tuesday, Haley suspended her campaign. On March 12, 2024, Trump officially became the presumptive Republican presidential nominee. Trump was injured in an assassination attempt on July 13, 2024, when a bullet grazed his ear. This was the first time a president or major party presidential candidate was injured in an assassination attempt since Ronald Reagan in 1981. On July 15, 2024, the first day of the Republican National Convention, Trump officially announced that Senator JD Vance of Ohio would be his running mate. On July 18, 2024, for the third consecutive time, Trump accepted the nomination from the Republican National Convention to become the Republican presidential nominee. Trump is the first major party candidate to have been nominated by their party for three or more consecutive elections since Franklin D. Roosevelt in 1944.

==== Nominees ====
Republican Party (United States) 2024 Republican Party ticket
Donald Trump	JD Vance
for President	for Vice President
45th President of the United States (2017–2021)	U.S. Senator from Ohio (2023–2025)
Campaign

==== Withdrawn candidates ====
Candidates in this section are sorted by date of withdrawal from the primaries
Nikki Haley	Ron DeSantis	Asa Hutchinson	Vivek Ramaswamy	Chris Christie	Doug Burgum
Ambassador to the United Nations (2017–2018)	46th Governor of Florida (2019–present)	46th Governor of Arkansas (2015–2023)	CEO of Roivant Sciences (2014–2023)	55th Governor of New Jersey (2010–2018)	33rd Governor of North Dakota (2016–2024)
Campaign	Campaign	Campaign	Campaign	Campaign	Campaign
W: March 6; 4,381,799 votes	W: Jan 23; 353,615 votes	W: Jan 16; 22,044 votes	W: Jan 15; 96,954 votes	W: Jan 10; 139,541 votes	W: December 4, 2023; 502 votes
Tim Scott	Mike Pence	Larry Elder	Perry Johnson	Will Hurd	Francis Suarez
U.S. Senator from South Carolina (2013–present)	48th Vice President of the United States (2017–2021)	Host of The Larry Elder Show (1993–2022)	Founder of Perry Johnson Registrars, Inc. (1994–present)	U.S. Representative from TX-23 (2015–2021)	Mayor of Miami (2017–2025)
Campaign	Campaign	Campaign	Campaign	Campaign	Campaign
W: November 12, 2023; 1,598 votes	W: October 28, 2023; 404 votes	W: October 23, 2023; 0 votes	W: October 20, 2023; 4,051 votes	W: October 9, 2023; 0 votes	W: August 23, 2023 0 votes

=== Democratic Party ===
Results of the 2024 Democratic presidential primaries. Biden (blue), as the presumptive nominee, won everything but American Samoa, which went to Jason Palmer (purple).

On July 24, Biden addressed the nation from the Oval Office on his decision three days earlier to withdraw from the race.

On April 25, 2023, President Joe Biden officially announced his re-election campaign, confirming that Vice President Kamala Harris would remain his running mate.

Concerns about Biden's age were prominent, given that he was the oldest person to assume the office at age 78, which would make him 82 at the end of his first term and 86 at the end of a potential second term. An April 2023 poll indicated that 70 percent of Americans, including 51 percent of Democrats, believed Biden should not seek a second term, with nearly half citing his age as the reason. Biden's approval rating stood at 41 percent, with 55 percent disapproving. Speculation also arose that Biden might face a primary challenge from the Democratic Party's progressive faction; however, after Democrats outperformed expectations in the 2022 midterm elections, many believed Biden's chances of securing the party's nomination had increased. On July 28, 2022, Representative Dean Phillips of Minnesota became the first incumbent Democratic member of Congress to say Biden should not run for re-election and called for "generational change", pointing to Biden's age.

Despite a handful of primary challengers, including Representative Dean Phillips, Robert F. Kennedy Jr., Marianne Williamson, and Jason Palmer, Biden easily became the party's presumptive nominee on March 12, 2024. Palmer, who won the American Samoa caucuses, became the first candidate to win a contested primary against an incumbent president since Ted Kennedy in 1980. Biden also faced significant opposition from uncommitted voters and the Uncommitted National Movement in their protest vote movement against Biden due to his support for Israel during the Gaza war, which collectively won 36 delegates.

Following a "disastrous" June 2024 debate performance against Trump that "inflamed age concerns", Biden ultimately withdrew from the race on July 21, 2024, and immediately endorsed Kamala Harris to replace him in his place as the party's presidential nominee. Harris quickly announced her own presidential campaign later that day and by the next day, Harris had secured the non-binding support of enough uncommitted delegates that were previously pledged to Biden to make her the party's presumptive nominee. Biden's withdrawal made him the first eligible incumbent president since Lyndon B. Johnson in 1968 not to seek re-election, and the first to withdraw after securing enough delegates to win the nomination. Harris is the first presidential nominee who did not participate in the presidential primaries since Vice President Hubert Humphrey, also in 1968, and the first since the modern Democratic Party primary procedure was created in 1972 (prior to which most states did not hold primary elections).

On August 5, 2024, after five days of online balloting, Democratic National Convention delegates voted to make Harris the party's 2024 presidential nominee. She selected Minnesota Governor Tim Walz as her running mate the following day and accepted the party's nomination on August 22.

==== Nominees ====
Democratic Party (United States) 2024 Democratic Party ticket
Kamala Harris	Tim Walz
for President	for Vice President
49th Vice President of the United States (2021–2025)	41st Governor of Minnesota (2019–present)
Campaign

==== Withdrawn candidates ====
Candidates in this section are sorted by date of withdrawal from the primaries
Joe Biden	Marianne Williamson	Jason Palmer	Dean Phillips	Robert F. Kennedy Jr.
46th President of the United States (2021–2025)	Author	Venture capitalist	U.S. Representative from MN-03 (2019–2025)	Environmental lawyer
Campaign	Campaign	Campaign	Campaign	Campaign
W: July 21; 14,465,519 votes	W: June 11; 473,761 votes	W: May 15; 20,975 votes	W: March 6; 529,664 votes	W: October 9, 2023; Ran as an independent

=== Third-party and independent candidates ===
A number of independent candidates announced presidential runs, most notably Robert F. Kennedy Jr. and Cornel West. Several third parties, including the Libertarian Party, the Green Party, the Party for Socialism and Liberation, the Constitution Party, and the American Solidarity Party also announced presidential nominees. Kennedy dropped out of the race in August 2024, although he remained on the ballot in many states. The No Labels organization abandoned its efforts to run a centrist candidate in April 2024.

==== With majority ballot access ====
===== Libertarian Party =====
Chase Oliver was chosen by the Libertarian Party as its presidential nominee on May 26, 2024, at the 2024 Libertarian National Convention. Oliver was the party's nominee in the 2022 United States Senate election in Georgia. Oliver achieved ballot access in 47 states, and was eligible to receive write-in votes in the District of Columbia, Illinois, New York, and Tennessee.

2024 Libertarian Party ticket
Chase Oliver	Mike ter Maat
for President	for Vice President
Sales account executive from Georgia	Economist from Virginia

===== Green Party =====
The party's nominee in 2012 and 2016, Stein is a physician and a former member of the Lexington Town Meeting. On August 16, Stein selected academic Butch Ware as her running mate. Stein achieved ballot access in 38 states, and was eligible to receive write-in votes in seven states. She was not eligible to receive write-in votes in the remaining states or the District of Columbia.

2024 Green Party ticket
Jill Stein	Butch Ware
for President	for Vice President
Physician from Massachusetts	Academic from California

==== With partial ballot access ====
These third-party candidates had ballot access in some states, but not enough to get 270 votes needed to win the presidency, without running a write-in campaign.

- American Solidarity Party: Peter Sonski, Connecticut school board member
- Approval Voting Party: Blake Huber, activist and nominee for president in 2020
- Constitution Party: Randall Terry, anti-abortion activist and perennial candidate
- Independent American Party: Joel Skousen, survivalist and consultant
- Natural Law Party: Robert F. Kennedy Jr., environmental lawyer and author, the party's nominee in addition to his run as an independent before he withdrew from the race ahead of the election but was not removed from ballots
- Party for Socialism and Liberation: Claudia De la Cruz, political activist
- Prohibition Party: Michael Wood, businessman
- Socialist Equality Party: Joseph Kishore, writer and SEP nominee in 2020
- Socialist Party USA: Bill Stodden, nonprofit executive
- Socialist Workers Party: Rachele Fruit, hotel worker and trade unionist

==== Independent candidates ====
The following notable individual(s) ran independently for president.

- Cornel West, academic, anti-war activist, and public intellectual, previously a People's Party and Green Party primaries candidate, who launched an independent campaign

==== Withdrawn candidates ====
The following notable individual(s) announced and then suspended their campaigns before the election:

- Robert F. Kennedy Jr., environmental lawyer, author, 2024 Democratic presidential candidate and 2024 independent presidential candidate (endorsed Trump)

== Campaign issues ==
=== Campaign themes ===
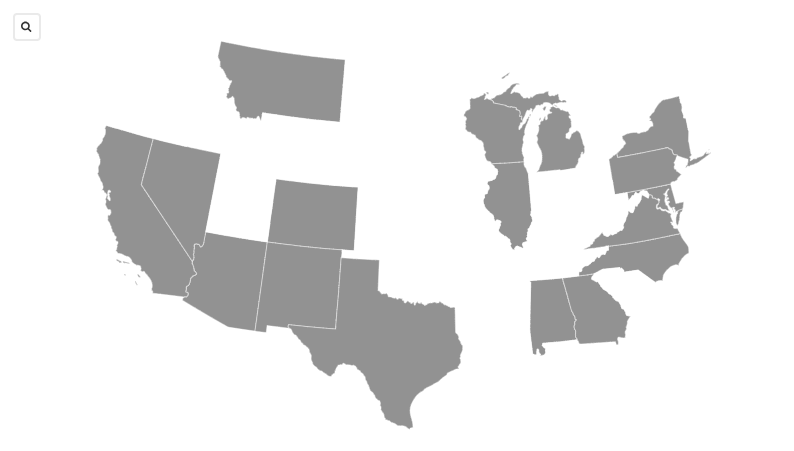
Presidential candidates Trump and Harris campaigned in 17 states, excluding their home states, from August to November in the 2024 United States presidential election.

==== Harris campaign ====
Harris framed her campaign as "a choice between freedom and chaos" and based it around the ideals of "freedom" and "the future". The Harris campaign sought to highlight her experience as an attorney general and a prosecutor to "prosecute the case" against Trump by pointing out his 34 felony convictions and the impacts of the overturning of Roe v. Wade. Harris had taken liberal positions on a number of issues in her bid for the 2020 Democratic nomination; in 2024, she shifted several of those positions toward the political center and embraced many of Biden's domestic policy stances. Harris focused her economic proposals on the cost of groceries, housing and healthcare.

==== Trump campaign ====
A central campaign theme for Trump's second presidential bid was "retribution". Trump framed the 2024 election as "the final battle", and openly promised to leverage the power of the presidency for political reprisals. Trump heavily ran on immigration as a central campaign focus. Trump's campaign focused on dark and apocalyptic rhetoric about the state of the country and predicting doom if he did not win. The Associated Press stated that "Trump's rallies take on the symbols, rhetoric and agenda of Christian nationalism." During his 2024 presidential campaign, Trump made numerous false and misleading statements. Trump has been described as using the "big lie" and firehose of falsehood propaganda techniques.

=== Abortion ===
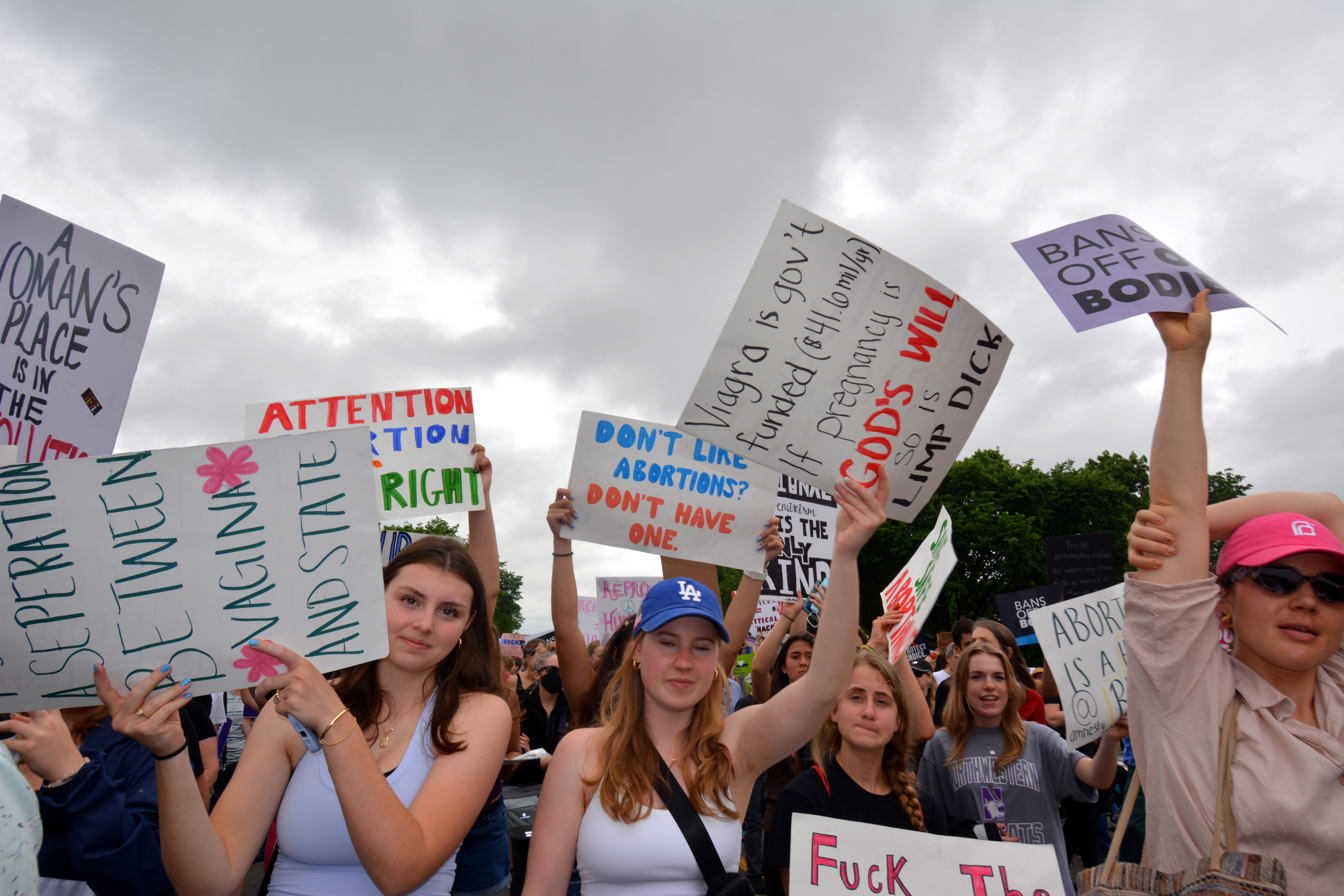
Abortion-rights protesters in Washington, D.C. in May 2022, as part of the Bans Off Our Bodies protest following the leaked draft opinion overturning Roe v. Wade

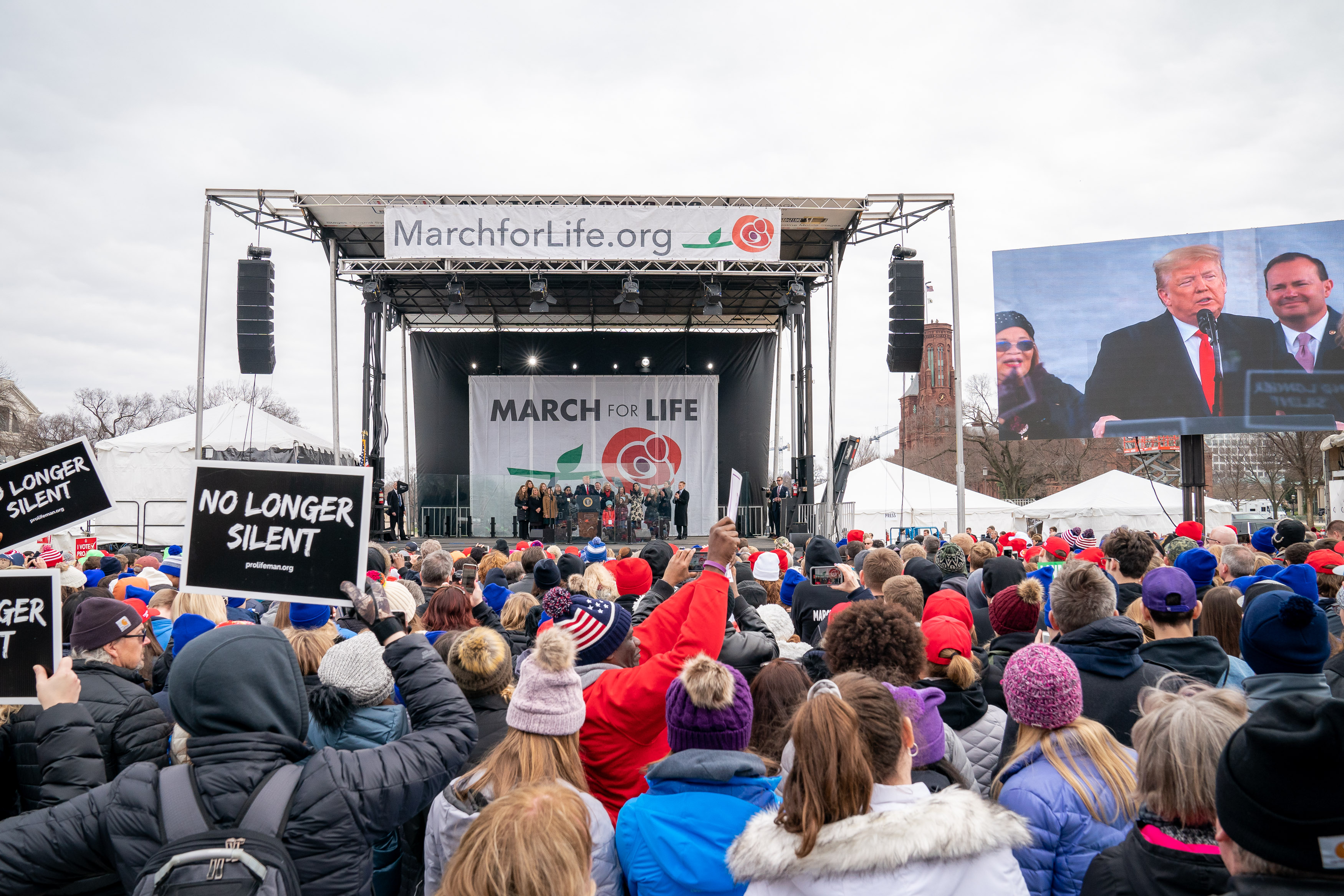
Trump speaking at the 2020 March for Life in Washington, D.C.

Abortion access was a key topic during the campaign; it was on the ballot in up to 10 states in 2024, including the swing states of Arizona and Nevada. Abortion was a key issue for many voters in the 2022 elections. The issue continued to motivate voters in 2024 along with "the future of democracy in this country" and "high prices for gas, groceries and other goods." According to AP VoteCast, 25% of voters ranked abortion policy as the single most important factor in their vote, similar to the share who in 2022 said that the Supreme Court overturning Roe v. Wade was important to their vote. Of the states where abortion was on the ballot, measures seeking to expand or protect abortion access failed in Florida, South Dakota and Nebraska.

Some pundits argued abortion rights referendums could help Harris in November. Democrats predominantly advocate for abortion access as a right, while Republicans generally favor significantly restricting the legality of abortion. Since becoming the presumptive nominee, Harris indicated her support for passing legislation which would restore the federal abortion right protections previously guaranteed by Roe. She argued Trump would let his anti-abortion allies implement Project 2025 proposals to restrict abortion and contraception throughout the United States.

Trump claimed credit for overturning Roe but criticized Republicans pushing for total abortion bans. Trump said he would leave the issue of abortion for the states to decide but would allow red states to monitor women's pregnancies and prosecute them if they have an abortion. In his home state of Florida, Trump announced he would vote "No" on Amendment 4, an abortion rights referendum, preserving the six-week ban. The announcement came one day after he initially criticized the six-week ban for being "too short" and said he would vote to lengthen it. Trump repeated a false claim that Democrats support abortions after birth and "executing" babies.

=== Border security and immigration ===
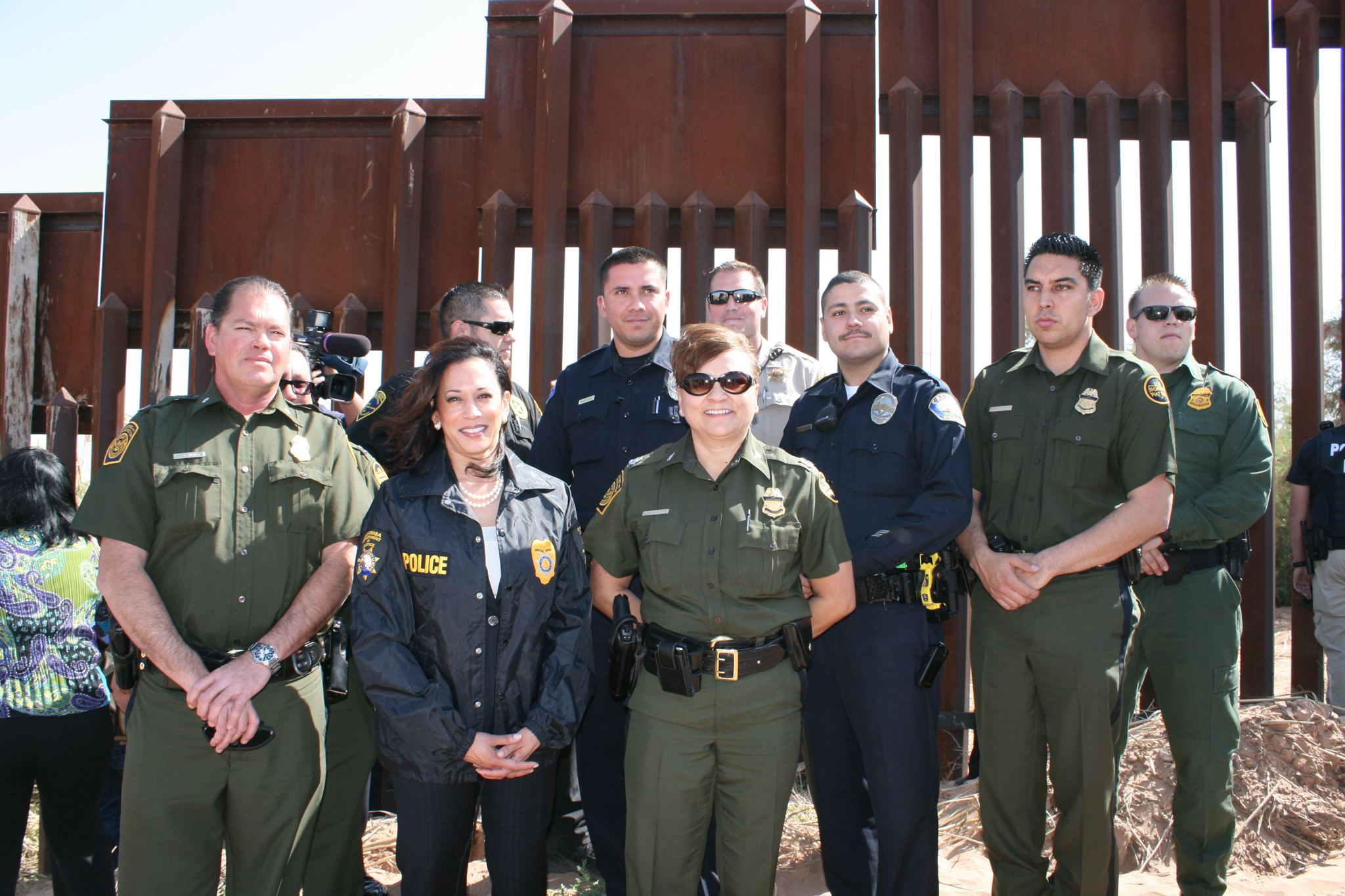
Harris as Attorney General of California at the border in 2011 to discuss strategies to combat transnational gang crime

Border security and immigration were among the top issues concerning potential voters in the election. Polling showed that most Americans want to reduce immigration, and that a substantial minority of white Republicans were concerned about white demographic decline. In 2023 and early 2024, a surge of migrants entering through the border with Mexico occurred. By June 2024, illegal crossings reached a three-year low following four consecutive monthly drops, which senior officials attributed to increased enforcement between the United States and Mexico, the weather, and Biden's executive order (A Proclamation on Securing the Border) increasing asylum restrictions.

Harris promised to fight for "strong border security" coupled with an earned pathway to citizenship. Harris highlighted her work in combating transnational gangs, drug cartels, and human traffickers while attorney general. As vice president, Harris announced in 2023 that she had garnered pledges of US$950 million from private companies to aid Central American communities to address the causes of mass migration, such as poverty. Harris stated she believes the immigration system is "broken" and needs to be fixed, and she said most Americans believe this. Harris also advocated for stricter asylum rules than Biden. Harris supported increasing the number of U.S. Border Patrol agents and accused Trump of being unserious on border security. As vice president, Harris also supported a bipartisan bill that would have funded additional border agents and closed the border if too crowded; the bill was rejected by Trump. Trump called on House and Senate Republicans to kill the bill, arguing it would hurt his and the Republican Party's reelection campaigns and deny them the ability to run on immigration as a campaign issue. Harris criticized Trump for his opposition to the bill on the campaign trail, and promised to sign the bill into law as president.

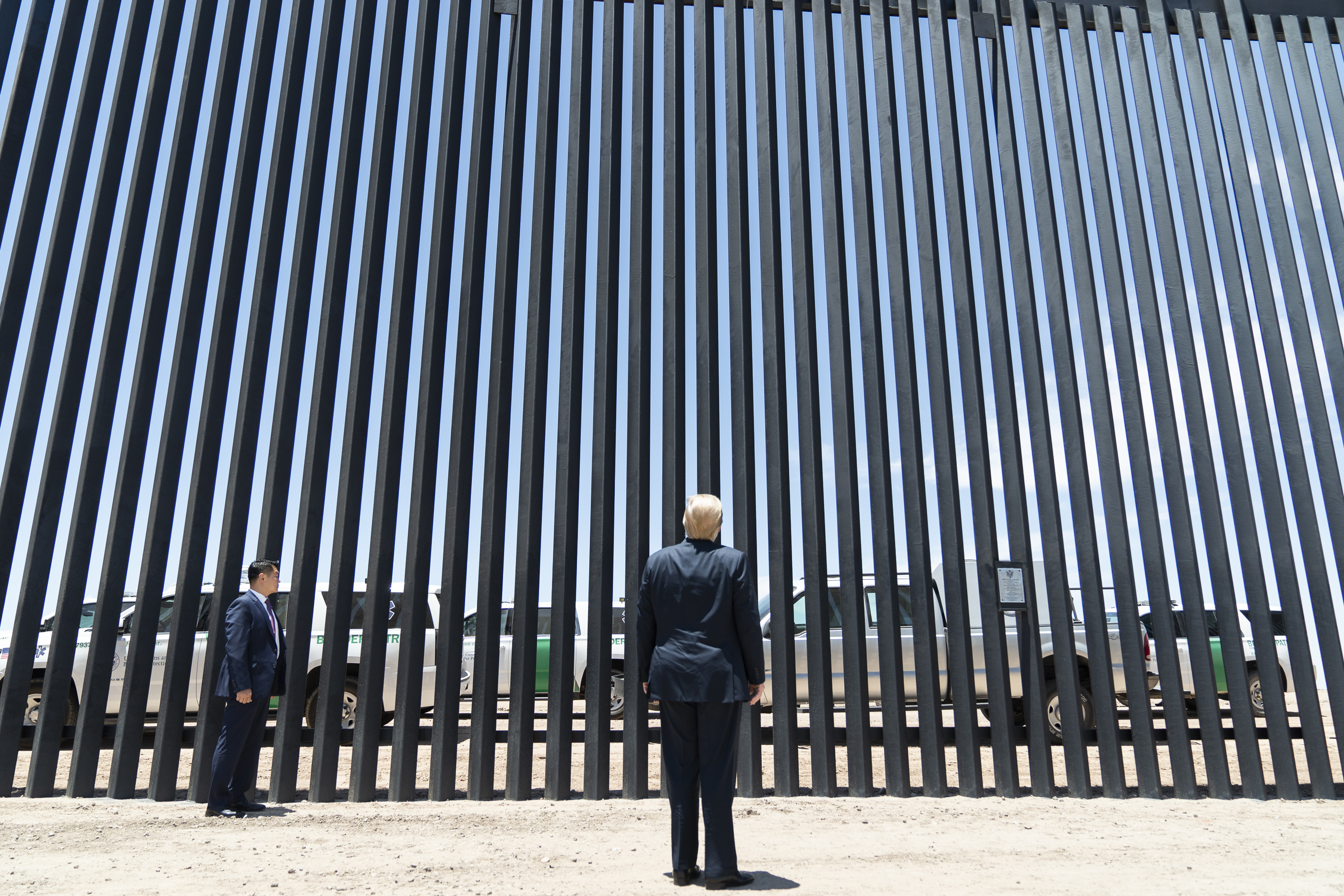
Trump pledged to finish the wall on the southern border if elected.

Trump stated that if he were elected, he would increase deportations, send the U.S. military to the border, expand U.S. Immigration and Customs Enforcement detentions through workplace raids, deputize local law enforcement to handle border security, increase U.S. Customs and Border Protection funding, as well as finish building the wall on the southern border. Trump has said he will deport both legal and illegal immigrants. The New York Times reported that Trump was considering "an extreme expansion of his first-term crackdown on immigration", such as "preparing to round up undocumented people already in the United States on a vast scale and detain them in sprawling camps while they wait to be expelled". Trump stated his intention to deport 11 million people through the construction of detention camps and deploy the military, relying on presidential wartime powers under the 18th-century Alien Enemies Act. Trump made false claims of a "migrant crime wave" that are not supported by data, and provided no evidence to back up his claims.

In regards to his anti-immigrant nativism, Trump's tone grew harsher from his previous time as president, and used fearmongering, racial stereotypes, and more dehumanizing rhetoric when referring to illegal immigrants. Trump repeatedly called some immigrants subhuman, stating they are "not human", "not people", and "animals", who will "rape, pillage, thieve, plunder and kill" American citizens, that they are "stone-cold killers", "monsters", "vile animals", "savages", and "predators" that will "walk into your kitchen, they'll cut your throat", and "grab young girls and slice them up right in front of their parents". Other rhetoric includes false statements that foreign leaders are deliberately emptying insane asylums to send "prisoners, murderers, drug dealers, mental patients, terrorists" across the southern border as migrants, that they are "building an army" of "fighting age" men to attack Americans "from within", and are the "enemy from within" who are ruining the "fabric" of the country. Since fall 2023, Trump claimed that immigrants are "poisoning the blood of our country", which drew comparisons to racial hygiene rhetoric used by white supremacists and Adolf Hitler. In the 20 rallies that occurred after Trump's debate with Harris, Politico cited experts who found that Trump's rhetoric strongly echoed authoritarian and Nazi ideology; Trump made claims that immigrants are genetically predisposed to commit crimes and have "bad genes".

=== Climate change ===
Climate change and energy policy played a role in the 2024 presidential campaign. In 2023, the United States saw a record in crude oil production with over 13.2 million barrels of crude per day, beating the 13 million barrels per day produced at the peak of Trump's presidency. The United States also dealt with supply shocks caused by the 2021–2024 global energy crisis due to the COVID-19 pandemic and Russian invasion of Ukraine. An advocate for environmental justice to address the impact of climate change on lower-income areas and people of color, Harris supported Biden's climate legislation. In 2022, Harris helped pass the Inflation Reduction Act, the largest investment in addressing climate change and clean energy in American history, putting the United States on track to meet emissions reduction targets by 50–52% below 2005 levels by 2030. Harris's campaign stated that she would not support a ban on fracking.

Trump ridiculed the idea of man-made climate change, and repeatedly referred to his energy policy under the mantra "drill, baby, drill". Trump said he would increase oil drilling on public lands and offer tax breaks to oil, gas, and coal producers, and stated his goal for the United States to have the lowest cost of electricity and energy of any country in the world. Trump also promised to roll back electric vehicle initiatives, proposed once again the United States withdrawal from the Paris Agreement, and rescind several environmental regulations. Trump stated his intention to roll back parts of the Inflation Reduction Act, Biden's signature domestic legislation. The implementation of Trump's plans would add around 4 billion tons of carbon dioxide to the atmosphere by 2030, also having effects on the international level. If the policies do not change further, it would add 15 billion tons by 2040 and 27 billion by 2050. Although the exact calculation is difficult, researchers stated: "Regardless of the precise impact, a second Trump term that successfully dismantles Biden's climate legacy would likely end any global hopes of keeping global warming below 1.5C."

=== Democracy ===
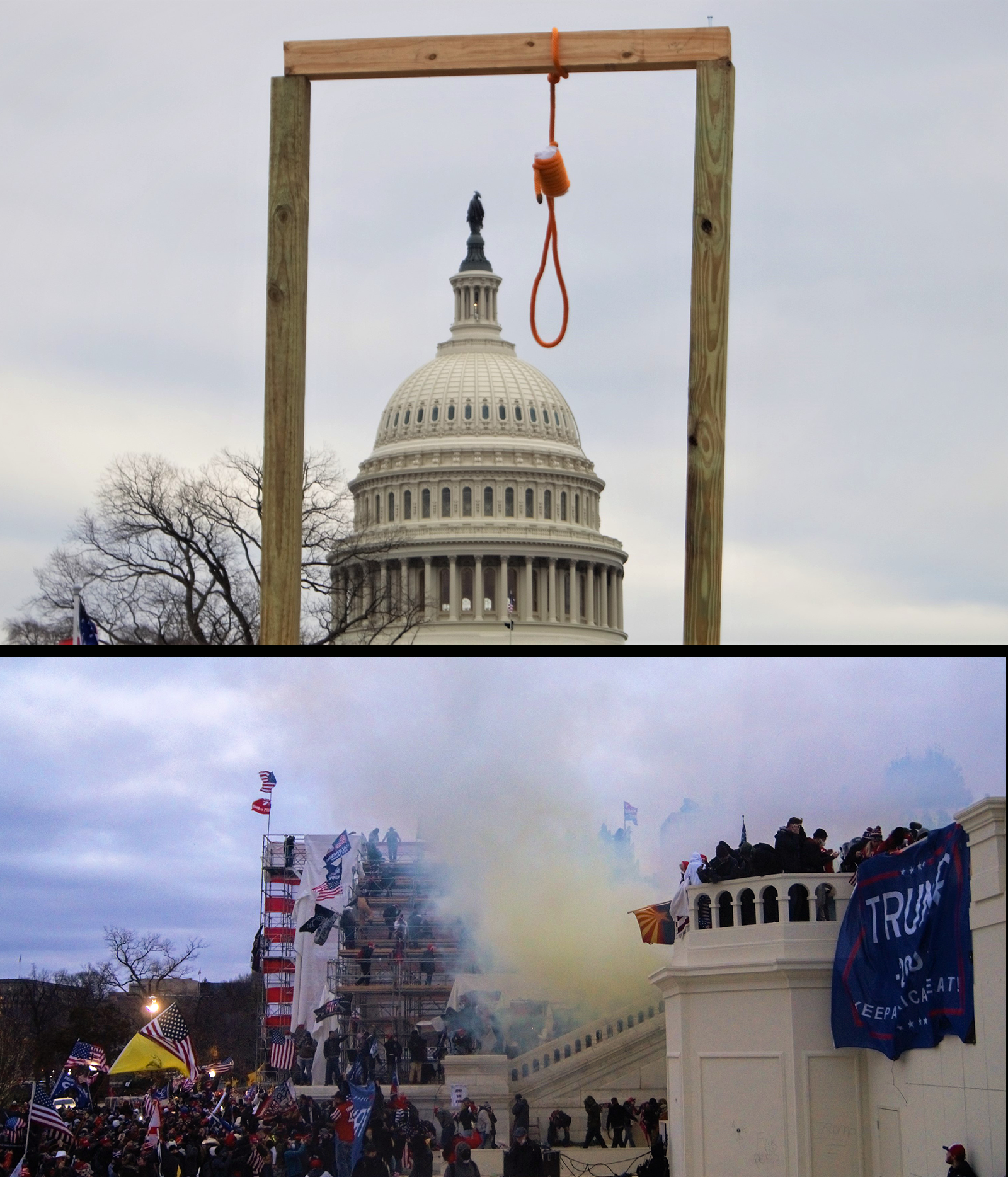
The election was the first presidential election following Trump's attempts to overturn the 2020 election and the January 6 United States Capitol attack. It also came amidst Trump's federal indictment for attempting to overturn the 2020 election and involvement in the attack and racketeering charges for attempting to overturn Biden's victory in Georgia.

Polling before the election indicated profound dissatisfaction with the state of American democracy. According to an October 25 ABC/Ipsos poll, 49% of Americans saw Trump as a fascist, described as "a political extremist who seeks to act as a dictator, disregards individual rights and threatens or uses force against their opponents". Meanwhile, only 22% saw Harris as a fascist by this definition. Some Republicans were concerned that Trump's former impeachment and four criminal indictments were attempts to influence the election and keep him from office; however, there is no evidence that Trump's criminal trials were "election interference" orchestrated by Biden and the Democratic Party, and Trump also continued to repeat false claims that the 2020 election was "rigged" and stolen from him.

Trump's 2024 presidential campaign was criticized by legal experts, historians, and political scientists for making increasingly dehumanizing, violent, and authoritarian statements. Trump's platform called for the vast expansion of presidential powers and the executive branch over every part of the federal government. Trump called for stripping employment protections for thousands of career civil service employees (a provision known as Schedule F appointment that had been adopted by Trump at the end of 2020) and replacing them with political loyalists if deemed an "obstacle to his agenda" within federal agencies, the United States Intelligence Community, State Department, and Department of Defense. Trump repeatedly stated his intention to have the Justice Department investigate and arrest his domestic political rivals, judges, prosecutors, and witnesses involved in his criminal trials. Calling the January 6, 2021, Capitol attack a "day of love", Trump promised to pardon those charged for their involvement and called them "hostages" and "great, great patriots". Trump played down the possibility of violence if he were to lose the 2024 election, but did not rule it out altogether.

Trump's 2024 campaign rhetoric has been described as fascist. Trump said his political opponents are a greater threat to the United States than countries such as Russia, China, and North Korea. He urged that the U.S. Armed Forces be deployed on American soil to fight "the enemy from within", which—according to Trump—included "radical left lunatics" and Democratic politicians such as Adam Schiff. Trump repeatedly voiced support for outlawing political dissent and criticism he considers misleading or challenges his claims to power. Trump previously tried to have his political rivals prosecuted during his first term.

Harris was tasked by Biden with protecting democracy through voting rights legislation through her work on the For the People Act. Harris supported efforts to defend election workers and counter Republican efforts to restrict voting following the 2020 presidential election. Harris also stated her intent to pass the Freedom to Vote Act and John Lewis Rights Voting Rights Advancement Act if elected.

A December 2023 Gallup poll found a record low 28% of Americans reporting that they were satisfied with the way democracy is working in the country. In the weeks before the election, surveys showed that many favored a concession speech from the losing presidential candidate, had broad concerns about the state of democracy and were fearful of future acts of political violence.

Surveys from the National Election Pool and VoteCast highlight the role the issue of democracy played in the election. According to results provided by the National Election Pool, 34% percent of voters said that the state of democracy mattered most to their vote. The poll found that 25% of those who cast a ballot said that democracy in the U.S. is secure, while 73% said it is threatened. VoteCast found that half of voters identified the future of democracy as the single most important factor for their vote. 9 in 10 Harris voters who said that democracy was the single most important factor expressed concern that electing Trump would bring the country closer to authoritarianism. About 80% of Trump voters who chose democracy as their top issue expressed concern about a Harris presidency becoming authoritarian.

=== Economic issues ===
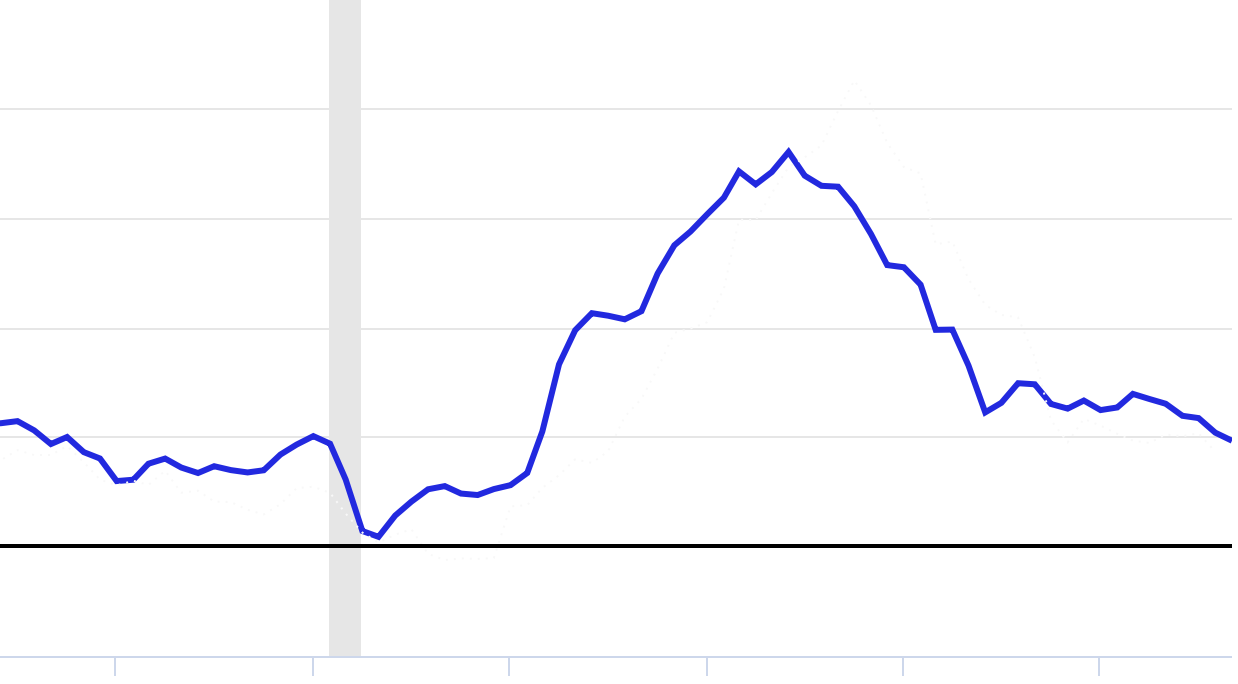
Post-COVID inflation spike in the United States, with the gray column indicating the COVID-19 recession

Voters consistently cited the economy as their top issue in the 2024 election. Following the COVID-19 pandemic, a global surge in inflation ensued that raised prices on many goods, although the U.S. inflation rate had declined significantly during 2023 and 2024. The New York Times reported that both candidates "embraced a vision of a powerful federal government, using its muscle to intervene in markets in pursuit of a stronger and more prosperous economy". The Wall Street Journal reported that economists found Trump's proposed policies created a greater risk of stoking inflation and generating higher budget deficits, relative to the Harris plan. Twenty-three Nobel Prize-winning economists signed a letter characterizing the Harris economic plan as "vastly superior" to the Trump plan. Trump's designated government efficiency leader Elon Musk said in October that he expected Trump's plan would involve more than $2 trillion in federal spending cuts and would cause "some temporary hardship." Harris ran on a pro-union platform. She promoted the passage of the Infrastructure Investment and Jobs Act, funding for small business, and previously supported an act as senator to provide a $6,000 tax credit for middle and low-income families. Harris promised to address price gouging, bring down costs, ban hidden fees and late charges from financial institutions, limit "unfair" rent increases and cap prescription drug costs, which she said would "lower costs and save many middle-class families thousands of dollars a year".

The New York Times described Harris's economic policy as embracing "the idea that the federal government must act aggressively to foster competition and correct distortions in private markets". Harris proposed raising taxes on corporations and high-earners to fund services for the lower and middle classes and reduce the deficit. Harris stated she supported increasing the top tier capital gains tax rate to 28%, up from 20% and lower than Biden's proposed 39.6%. Harris stated her support for a Billionaire Minimum Income Tax, increasing the tax on stock buybacks to 4%, and a ten-fold tax reduction for small business ranging from $5,000 to $50,000 in relief. Harris also supported efforts to create a tax on unrealized gains for those with more than a $100 million in net worth if they do not pay a minimum 25% tax rate on their income inclusive of unrealized gains so long as 80% of said wealth is in tradeable assets. The plan would impact a small percentage of the wealthy in the United States, and Axios reported most tech founders and investors would be spared. Harris also announced support for restoring the corporate tax rate to 28% among several other tax proposals to raise taxes and close loopholes for corporations and the wealthy that would bring in $5 trillion in additional revenue over 10 years. Harris proposed tax breaks to companies delivering economic benefit, such as manufacturing technologies that mitigate climate change and building affordable housing, and proposed a ban on corporate price gouging to "help the food industry become more competitive". Harris also expressed support for student debt relief, and said she supported raising the minimum wage.

In response to the housing crisis in the United States, Harris said she would increase home construction to reduce housing costs, arguing that it negatively impacts the economy and hurts working-class families. Harris proposed directing $40 billion to construction companies to build starter homes, and promised to send $25,000 in down-payment assistance to every first time home buyer. Harris said she would urge Congress to enforce fair housing laws and pass a bill to bar property owners from using services that "coordinate" rents through the passage of the Preventing the Algorithmic Facilitation of Rental Housing Cartels Act, and also call on Congress to pass the Stop Predatory Investing Act by removing tax benefits to Wall Street firms that buy up large numbers of single-family homes. Trump proposed further individual and corporate tax cuts beyond the 2017 Tax Cuts and Jobs Act. Trump argued that keeping taxes low for the wealthy increases job creation, and that these policies coupled with a crackdown in illegal immigration and reduction in inflation would help the middle class. Trump said he would reduce regulation of business through the creation of an efficiency commission led by Musk, along with reducing environmental regulation. By October 2024, Musk was Trump's second-largest individual campaign donor. Trump said deporting millions of immigrants would bring housing prices down, although most economists argue it could raise prices by removing construction workers who use less real estate. Trump and Harris support not taxing tips for at least hospitality and service workers. Trump suggested that he would abolish the federal income tax and replace it with tariffs. In June 2024, Trump discussed the idea of eliminating the income tax in a private meeting with Republican politicians. In October 2024, Trump suggested that he would scrap the income tax if he wins, pointing out that tariffs were the main sources of revenue in the 19th century.

Trump's stated trade policy involves the United States decoupling from the global economy and having the country become more self-contained and exerting its power through individual trade dealings. This would be attempted largely through a universal baseline tariff, set from 10% to 20% on all imports, with increased penalties if trade partners manipulate their currency or engage in unfair trade practices. Trump called for 100% tariffs on cars made outside the United States and a minimum 60% tariff on Chinese goods. Trump stated his plans to urge Congress to pass a Trump Reciprocal Trade Act to bestow presidential authority to impose a reciprocal tariff on any country that imposed one on the United States. The Washington Post reported in January 2024 that Trump was preparing for a massive trade war. Trump's trade policies were described as protectionist, neo-mercantilist, or autarkist, and increasing inflation became a more common critique of Trump's economic plans. In June 2024, 16 Nobel Prize in Economics laureates signed an open letter arguing that Trump's fiscal and trade policies coupled with efforts to limit the Federal Reserve's independence would reignite inflation in the United States. Moody's, as well as most economists surveyed by The Wall Street Journal in July 2024, predicted that inflation would be worse under Trump than Biden, a result due in part to tariffs, a crack down on illegal immigration, and larger deficits. Trump incorrectly insisted foreign exporters pay tariffs imposed by the U.S. government; American importers pay tariffs on goods upon arrival at U.S. ports, meaning tariffs are taxes that raise prices for imported products Americans buy. One non-partisan analysis estimated the proposed tariffs would cost $1,700 per year for the average household. The Committee for a Responsible Federal Budget found that Trump's plans would grow the national debt at roughly twice the rate of Harris' plan, while the Institute on Taxation and Economic Policy found Trump's plan would only benefit the top 5% of earners.

=== Education ===
Trump pledged to terminate the U.S. Department of Education, claiming it has been infiltrated by "radical zealots and Marxists". At the American Federation of Teachers national convention, Harris attacked recent efforts to ban books in school libraries. She also previously called for raising teachers' wages.

=== Healthcare issues ===
Unlike previous elections, healthcare reform played a much more minor role in the 2024 presidential election. Harris stated that she no longer supported a single-payer healthcare system as she had in 2020. Instead, she said she intended to protect and expand items legislated during the Obama and Biden administrations. She said she would "maintain and grow" the Affordable Care Act, while Trump said that he would replace it with his own healthcare plan. Harris also supported limiting yearly out-of-pocket drug costs for seniors, and expanding the $35 cap on insulin for seniors on Medicare to younger individuals in the program as well. Generally, both candidates supported using the government to rein in prescription drug costs. Trump suggested he was open to cutting entitlement programs, such as Social Security and Medicare, part of an effort to "[cut] waste" as described by his campaign. During his first term, several budget proposals did suggest cuts to the programs. Additionally, Vance and Speaker of the House Mike Johnson suggested cuts to the ACA, including around pre-existing conditions, were part of Trump's plan. After Robert F. Kennedy Jr. dropped out of the race and endorsed Trump, Kennedy advocated for his "Make America Healthy Again" agenda, pledging to combat the upward trend in chronic disease patients, with Trump saying Kennedy would "go wild" regarding policy on food and medicines.

=== Foreign policy ===
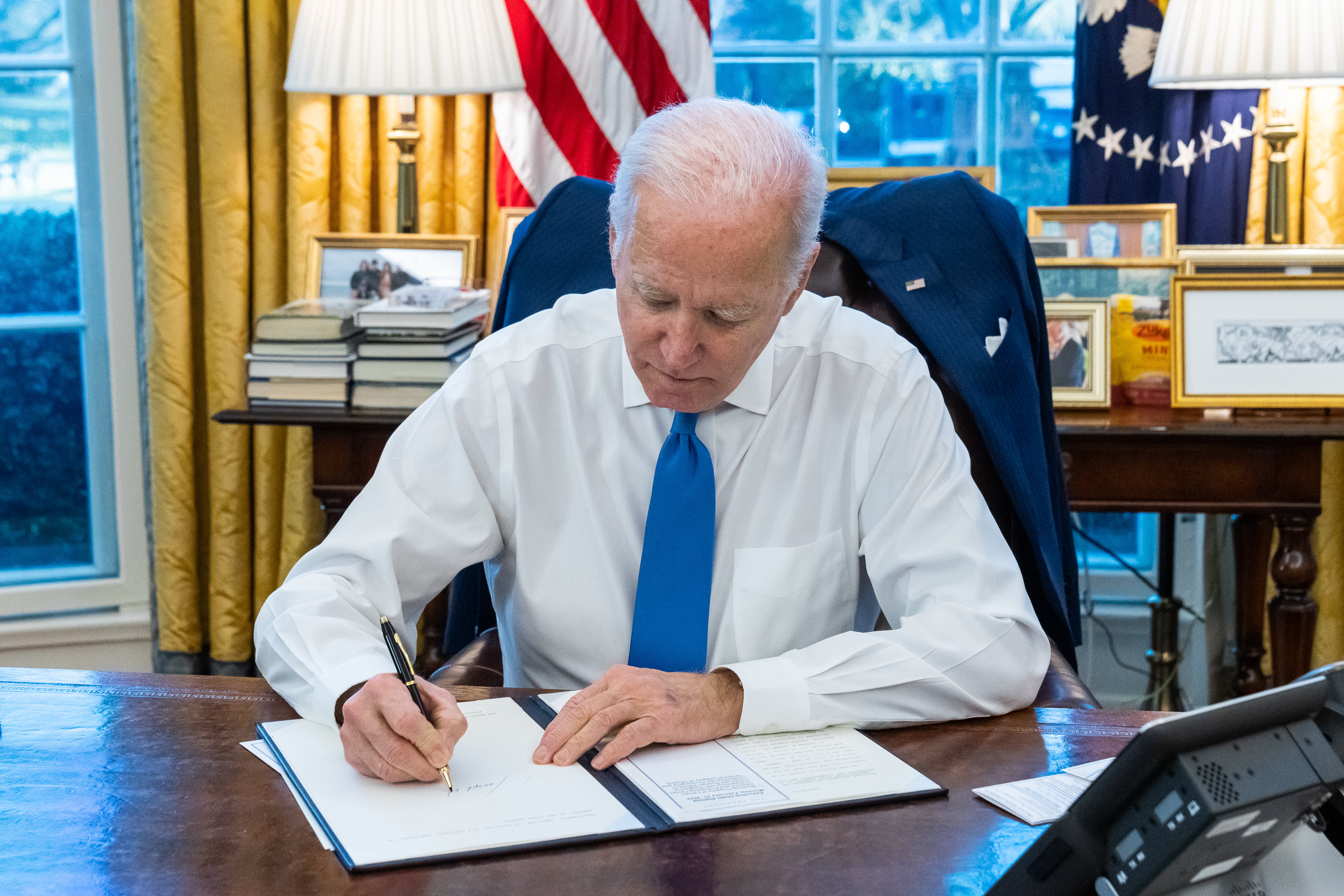
Joe Biden signing Executive Order 14065 in February 2022 in response to Russia's imminent invasion of Ukraine. The United States has given billions worth of military aid to Ukraine following the Russian invasion of the country in 2022.

The Russo-Ukrainian war, the Gaza war, and Chinese expansionism were some of the main foreign policy issues of the election. Harris signaled she would generally follow Biden's foreign policy on NATO and Ukraine, supporting both in the aftermath of the Russian invasion. A supporter of the two-state solution to the Israeli-Palestinian conflict, Harris advocated for "de-risking" from China, a policy that encourages reducing Western economic dependence on China. Harris was expected to continue deepening American alliances in Asia and the Pacific with the intention of curbing China's rising power both economically and militarily.

Trump's 2024 campaign promoted an isolationist, "America First" foreign policy. Trump said that America's allies "treat us actually worse than our so-called enemies", and added: "We protect them and then they screw us on trade." He also vowed to impose tariffs on trade partners; economists said this could spark trade wars. He promised to "fundamentally reevaluate" NATO, shifting the country's defense spending from Europe towards Asia. Although NATO members are obliged to defend any other member who is attacked, Trump said he would encourage Russia to "do whatever the hell they want" to NATO allies that did not spend enough on defense. NATO Secretary-General Jens Stoltenberg responded: "Any suggestion that allies will not defend each other undermines all of our security." Trump vowed that even before he was inaugurated, he would negotiate an end to the Russo-Ukrainian war in one day. He promised to quickly cut the amount of military and financial aid to Ukraine, and make Europeans reimburse the United States the cost of rebuilding its old stockpiles; however, most of the money for Ukraine actually goes to American factories that make weapons and military equipment. Trump previously said he might recognize Russia's illegal annexation of Crimea, and suggested the 2022 invasion could have been prevented by Ukraine giving up parts of its own country to Russia. Trump promised a tougher stance against China, and at the same time questioned whether the United States should defend Taiwan. Trump suggested withdrawing troops from South Korea if it does not pay more to support American troops there.

==== Gaza war views ====
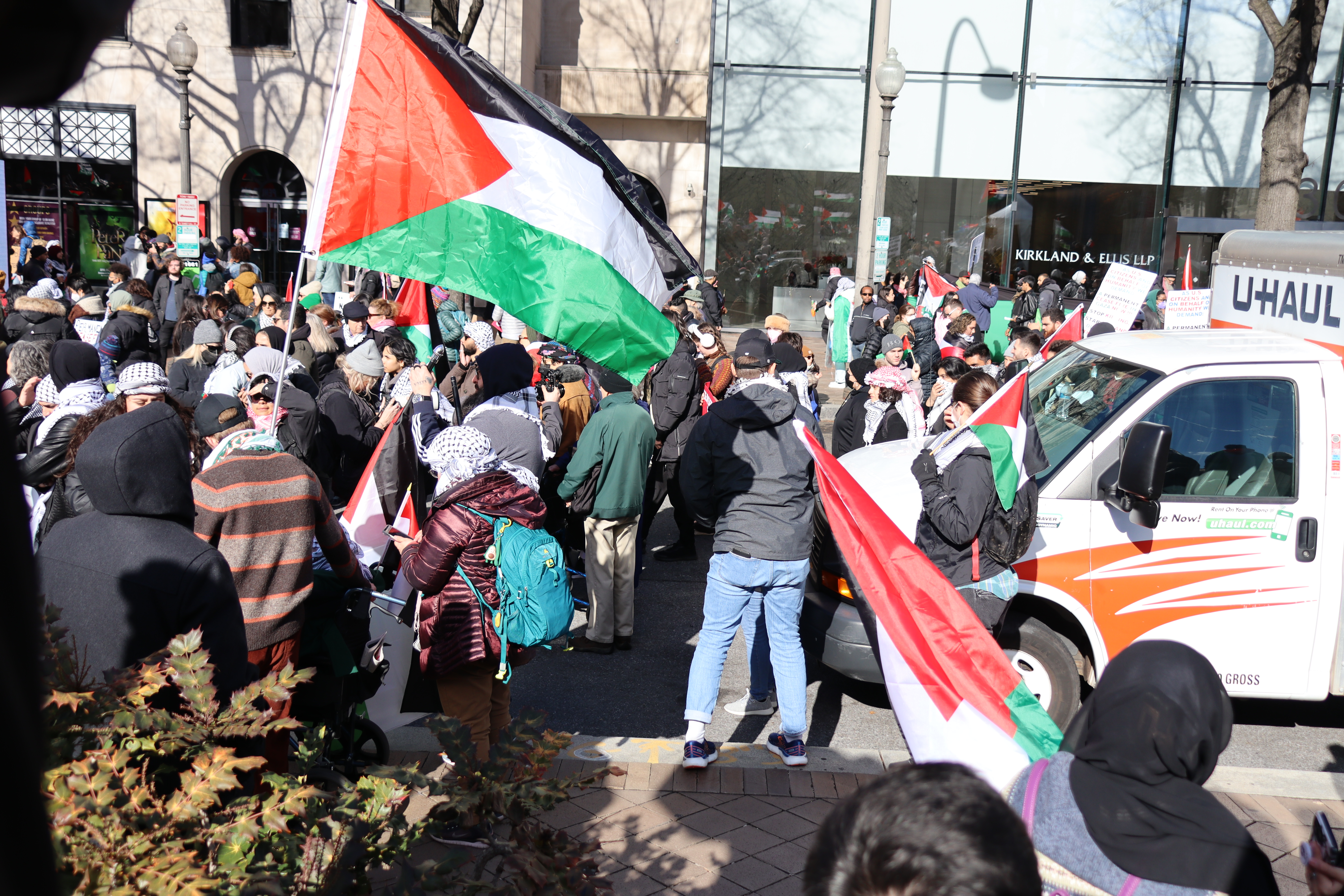
Demonstrators at the March on Washington for Gaza in January 2024

External videos
- Harris interrupted by pro-Palestine protesters at campaign rally

Polling indicated that the majority of voters support a ceasefire and American mediation in the Gaza war. According to a YouGov poll in March 2024, 52% of Americans supported stopping weapons shipments to Israel, coming largely from Americans who voted for Biden in 2020 (62% support) and people who did not vote in 2020 (60%). 55% of Americans who voted for Trump in 2020 opposed halting weapons shipments, while 30% supported the measure. Republicans generally supported arms to Israel, while Democrats were divided on the issue.

Harris largely continued Biden's approach to the Israeli–Palestinian conflict, although she was seen as more sympathetic to Palestinians than Biden or Trump. During the Gaza war, Harris supported Israel's offensive, saying "the threat Hamas poses to the people of Israel must be eliminated". By March 2024, Harris was increasingly critical of Israel, calling for a ceasefire and two-state solution, and opposing the Rafah offensive, though still supporting the war overall. In the Democratic primaries, the Uncommitted National Movement led a protest campaign against Biden and later Harris over the war, calling for a ceasefire and arms embargo on Israel. It received over 700,000 votes and 36 delegates. Harris engaged with Uncommitted and Arab-American leaders, but refused to change her position. Harris argued for continued weapons shipments to Israel, saying it had a right to defend itself. Uncommitted ultimately encouraged its supporters to vote for Harris, though many were reluctant.

Trump consistently supported Israel, though presented himself as the "candidate of peace". Trump also supported giving weapons to Israel, likely with "no strings attached", saying that it must "finish the problem". Trump was seen by some as more pro-Israel and less sympathetic to Palestine than Biden or Harris. Trump took a hardline stance against pro-Palestinian protests, telling donors he would "crush" them and deport non-citizen protestors to "set the movement back 25 or 30 years". At times, Trump was critical of Israel's conduct, saying Israel should "get it over with ... get back to peace and stop killing people". However, he pledged to end the war in Gaza through negotiation and bring peace to the Middle East. Trump called Biden's airstrikes on Yemen "crazy" and suggested negotiating with the Houthis.

=== LGBTQ rights ===
In the 2020s, conservative politicians in state legislatures introduced a growing number of bills that restrict the rights of LGBTQ people, especially transgender people. A strong supporter of LGBTQ rights, Harris denounced legislative attacks on transgender rights in states across the country. Exit polls showed that Harris had an 86%-12% advantage over Trump among voters who say that they are gay, lesbian, bisexual or transgender. Harris' lead among this group is the largest for a 21st-century Democratic presidential candidate with those reporting to be gay, lesbian, bisexual or transgender (2016–2024) and gay/lesbian/bisexual respondents (2000–2008). Exit poll results for the 2012 election are not available. Trump promised to roll back policies regarding transgender individuals. Harris and Walz campaigned as supporters of LGBTQ+ rights. Trump stated he would rescind Biden's Title IX protections "on day one" for transgender students using bathrooms, locker rooms, and pronouns that align with their gender identities. Trump stated he would enact a federal law that would recognize only two genders and claimed that being transgender is a concept only recently manufactured by "the radical left". Trump previously withdrew Title IX provisions that allowed transgender youth to have access to the bathrooms of their choice, and he attempted to roll-back several transgender-related policies in the Affordable Care Act. Trump repeated a false claim that children undergo transgender surgery while at school, without parental knowledge or consent. According to Future Forward PAC, a derivative of his campaign's "Kamala is for they/them, President Trump is for you" attack ad (with commentary by Charlamagne tha God spliced in) was one of the most effective of the campaign, shifting the race 2.7 percentage points in favor of Trump after viewers watched it. However, findings from an RCT study released by Ground Media/GLAAD said that the ad did not have an impact on who viewers intended to vote for.

== Election-related violence ==
=== Assassination attempts on Trump ===
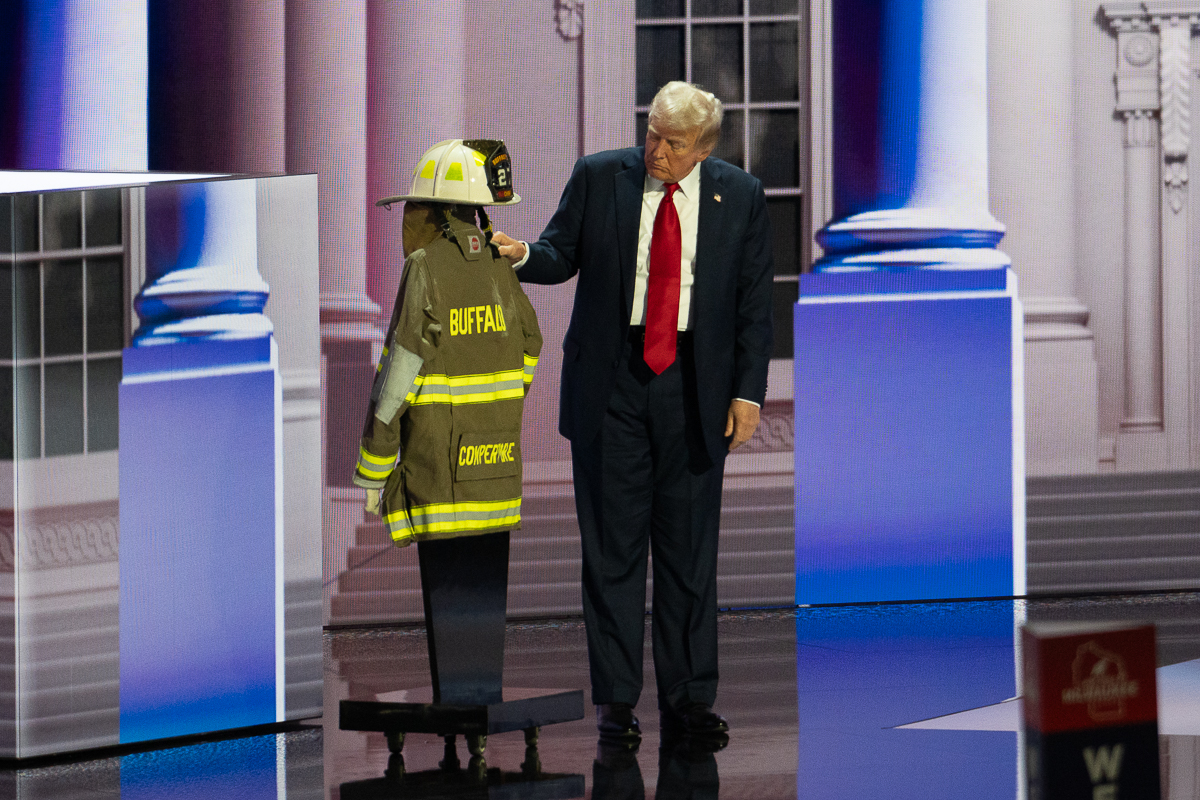
Trump at the RNC standing alongside the fire department uniform of Corey Comperatore, who was killed during the attempted assassination of Trump

On July 13, 2024, Trump survived an assassination attempt while addressing a campaign rally near Butler, Pennsylvania. Trump was shot and wounded on his right ear by 20-year-old Thomas Crooks, who fired eight rounds with an AR-15–style rifle from the roof of a building approximately 400 feet (120 metres) from the stage; the shots killed one audience member and critically injured two others. Seconds later, Crooks was shot and killed by the U.S. Secret Service's counter-sniper team. On September 11, 2024, a bipartisan Senate report identified technical issues and other preventable mistakes by the Secret Service during the event.

On September 15, 2024, Trump survived a second assassination attempt at Trump International Golf Club in West Palm Beach, Florida. The perpetrator, 58-year-old Ryan Wesley Routh, took position in nearby shrubbery holding an SKS-style rifle just outside the fence of the golf course. After hiding there for nearly 12 hours, Routh pointed his weapon through the fence line, approximately 400 yards (370 m) away from Trump. A Secret Service agent noticed this and fired four rounds towards Routh, who fled the scene and was later captured in Martin County. No injuries were reported. Routh was later indicted on five federal charges and three state charges, all of which Routh pleaded not guilty to. His trial began on September 8, 2025. Two weeks later on September 23, Routh was found guilty on all federal counts, where he then grabbed a pen and attempted to stab himself in the neck, before being tackled by U.S. marshals. Routh was sentenced to life without parole on February 4, 2026.

=== Violence towards election workers ===
Since the 2020 election and continuing into the 2024 election, the election denial movement prompted thousands of death threats directed at election workers, officials, and their families, with some receiving letters laced with fentanyl. As of March 2024, the Department of Justice's Election Threats Task Force had charged 20 people with threat-related crimes. In September 2024, suspicious packages were sent to state election officials in several states, which resulted in evacuations. The inclusion of white powder in most of the packages mirrored the 2001 anthrax attacks; the substance in Oklahoma packages was identified as flour. Threats led some election workers to resign, and affected recruitment of temporary poll workers. In locations where funds were available, efforts to protect election workers involved active shooter training, provision of first aid kits and Narcan, bulletproof vests, bulletproof glass, metal detectors, armed guards, police snipers, and drones.

=== Violence towards voters ===
On October 30, 2024, an 18-year-old man in Jacksonville, Florida, was arrested for aggravated assault and improper exhibition of a dangerous weapon after brandishing a machete at two women outside an early voting center. He, along with seven other teenagers, allegedly approached and antagonized members of the opposing political party as they were demonstrating. Neither the teenager's nor the women's political parties were disclosed, although later posts by the Duval Democratic Party described the teenager's party as a "group of young men carrying Trump flags". On November 1, 2024, a voter wearing a "Let's Go Brandon" hat was reportedly struck by a poll worker after a verbal altercation over his hat at an Orangeburg County, South Carolina, polling location. Also on November 1, a man in Bath, New York, was arrested for assaulting someone in a supermarket for wearing a Trump hat.

=== Arson of ballot boxes ===
In late October 2024, multiple fires were reported at ballot drop boxes in Portland, Oregon, and Vancouver, Washington. The fires damaged hundreds of ballots, requiring election officials to identify and offer new ballots to those affected by the fires. Prior to the fires, the Federal Bureau of Investigation and the Department of Homeland Security had issued a bulletin raising concerns that "election-related grievances" could motivate domestic extremist activity and that ballot drop boxes could potentially be "attractive targets". In Phoenix, Arizona, a fire was started in a mail collection box, destroying some ballots and other mail. A suspect was arrested and claimed that the fire was unrelated to the election.

== Opinion polling and forecasts ==
=== Exit poll ===
==== Voter demographics ====
2024 presidential election exit poll compared to 2020
Demographic subgroup	Trump	Harris	% of total vote	Rep. swing	Dem. swing
Total vote	50	48	100	+3	−3
Ideology
Liberals	7	91	23	−3	+2
Moderates	40	58	42	+6	−6
Conservatives	90	9	35	+5	−5
Party
Democrats	4	95	31	−2	+1
Republicans	94	5	35	0	−1
Independents	46	49	34	+5	−5
Gender
Men	55	43	47	+2	−2
Women	45	53	53	+3	−4
Marital status
Married	56	42	54	+3	−3
Unmarried	42	55	46	+2	−3
Gender by marital status
Married men	60	38	28	+5	−5
Married women	52	47	26	+1	−1
Unmarried men	48	48	19	+3	−4
Unmarried women	38	61	26	+2	−1
Race/ethnicity
White	57	42	71	−1	+1
Black	13	86	11	+1	−1
Latino	46	51	11	+13	−14
Asian	40	55	3	+4	−8
Native American/American Indian	68	31	1	N/A	N/A
Other	52	44	2	+11	−11
Gender by race/ethnicity
White men	60	38	34	−1	0
White women	53	46	37	−2	+2
Black men	21	77	5	+2	−2
Black women	7	92	7	−2	+2
Latino men	54	44	6	+18	−15
Latina women	39	58	6	+9	−11
Other	47	49	6	+9	−9
Religion
Protestant/Other Christian	63	36	43	+3	−3
Catholic	59	39	21	+12	−13
Jewish	22	78	2	0	+2
Other religion	34	61	10	+5	−7
No religious affiliation	27	71	24	−4	+6
Religion by race
White Protestant	72	26	31	0	−1
White Catholic	63	35	15	+7	−9
White Jewish	20	79	2	N/A	N/A
White other religion	42	55	5	+9	−10
White no religious affiliation	26	71	17	−11	+10
White evangelical or born again Christian
Yes	82	17	23	+6	−7
No	40	58	77	+4	−4
Age
18–24 years old	43	54	8	+12	−11
25–29 years old	45	53	5	+2	−1
30–39 years old	45	51	15	−1	0
40–49 years old	49	49	15	+5	−5
50–64 years old	56	43	27	+4	−4
65 and older	50	49	28	−2	+2
Age by gender
Men 18–29 years old	49	48	7		
Men 30–44 years old	52	45	11		
Men 45–64 years old	59	39	16		
Men 65 and older	56	43	12		
Women 18–29 years old	38	61	7		
Women 30–44 years old	41	56	12		
Women 45–64 years old	50	49	19		
Women 65 years and older	46	53	16		
Age by race
White 18–29 years old	49	49	8		
White 30–44 years old	54	44	15		
White 45–64 years old	61	37	25		
White 65 and older	56	43	23		
Black 18–29 years old	16	83	2		
Black 30–44 years old	15	83	3		
Black 45–64 years old	14	84	4		
Black 65 and older	6	93	3		
Latino 18–29 years old	45	51	2		
Latino 30–44 years old	45	52	3		
Latino 45–64 years old	48	51	4		
Latino 65 and older	41	58	2		
Others	47	49	6		
LGBT
Yes	12	86	8	−11	+11
No	53	45	92	+5	−6
First time voter
Yes	55	44	8	+23	−20
No	49	49	92	0	0
Education
No college degree	56	43	57	+6	−5
College graduate	42	56	43	−1	+1
Educational attainment
High school or less	62	36	15	+8	−10
Some college education	51	47	26	+4	−4
Associate degree	57	41	16	+7	−6
Bachelor's degree	45	53	24	−2	+2
Postgraduate degree	38	59	19	+1	−3
Education by race
White college graduates	45	53	33	−3	+2
White no college degree	66	32	38	−1	0
Non-White college graduates	32	65	10	+5	−5
Non-White no college degree	34	64	18	+8	−8
Education by race/gender
White women with college degrees	41	58	17	−4	+4
White women without college degrees	63	35	20	0	−1
White men with college degrees	50	48	16	−1	0
White men without college degrees	69	29	18	−1	+1
Non-White	33	64	29	+7	−7
Income
Under $30,000	46	50	11	0	−4
$30,000–49,999	52	46	16	+8	−10
$50,000–99,999	52	46	32	+10	−10
$100,000–199,999	48	51	28	−9	+10
Over $200,000	46	52	13	−2	+4
Union households
Yes	45	53	19	+4	−3
No	51	47	81	+2	−3
Military service
Veterans	65	34	13	+11	−10
Non-veterans	48	50	87	+3	−3
Region
East	44	54	20	+4	−4
Midwest	52	46	22	+1	−1
South	56	43	35	+3	−3
West	43	54	22	+2	−3
Area type
Urban	38	60	29	0	0
Suburban	51	47	52	+3	−3
Rural	64	34	19	+7	−8
White suburban voters by gender
White suburban women	53	46	20		
White suburban men	62	36	18		
Other voters	45	52	62		

==== Issue questions ====
2024 presidential election exit poll
Response category	Trump	Harris	% of total vote
Total vote	50	48	100
Biden job approval
Strongly disapprove	94	4	45
Somewhat disapprove	42	54	14
Somewhat approve	4	95	24
Strongly approve	1	98	15
2020 presidential vote
Biden	5	93	44
Trump	95	4	44
Another candidate	44	34	2
Did not vote	49	46	10
Feeling about the way things are going in U.S.
Angry	73	26	31
Dissatisfied	55	42	42
Satisfied	16	83	19
Enthusiastic	9	91	6
America's best days are
In the future	40	58	61
In the past	67	31	34
Quality of candidate that mattered most
Has ability to lead	66	33	30
Can bring needed change	74	24	28
Has good judgment	15	83	20
Cares about people like me	25	72	18
Vote for president mainly
For your candidate	55	44	73
Against their opponent	36	60	24
Candidate viewed as too extreme
Trump is too extreme	2	97	45
Harris is too extreme	99	1	39
Both Harris and Trump are too extreme	67	22	8
Neither Harris or Trump is too extreme	67	27	4
Decided on presidential vote
Before September	51	49	80
In September	46	52	6
In October	42	49	5
In last week	56	42	3
In last few days	47	42	3
Feeling if Trump elected president
Excited	98	2	22
Optimistic	94	5	27
Concerned	12	84	14
Scared	1	97	35
Feeling if Harris elected president
Excited	1	99	23
Optimistic	6	93	25
Concerned	89	7	20
Scared	98	1	30
Favorable opinion of
Only Harris	1	99	44
Only Trump	99	0	44
Both Harris and Trump	52	47	2
Neither	52	32	8
Issue regarded as most important
Democracy	18	80	34
Economy	81	18	32
Abortion	24	76	14
Immigration	89	9	12
Foreign policy	56	39	4
Democracy threatened in the United States
Democracy in U.S. very threatened	52	47	39
Democracy in U.S. somewhat threatened	48	50	34
Democracy in U.S. somewhat secure	47	50	17
Democracy in U.S. very secure	54	44	8
Confident election being conducted fairly and accurately
Very confident	13	84	35
Somewhat confident	59	39	32
Not very confident	82	16	21
Not at all confident	80	18	10
Concerned about violence as result of election
Yes	42	56	70
No	69	29	28
Condition of the nation's economy
Poor	88	10	33
Not so good	52	46	35
Good	7	92	27
Excellent	11	89	5
Family's financial situation today
Worse than four years ago	82	16	47
About the same	27	71	29
Better than four years ago	14	83	24
Inflation caused family hardship within past year
Severe hardship	76	23	22
Moderate hardship	52	46	53
No hardship	21	78	24
Candidate trusted more to handle the economy
Trump	93	5	53
Harris	1	98	46
Abortion should be
Legal in all cases	9	88	33
Legal in most cases	49	49	33
Illegal in most cases	92	7	25
Illegal in all cases	88	11	5
Candidate trusted more to handle abortion
Trump	96	2	46
Harris	5	93	49
Opinion of Supreme Court
Approve	85	14	36
Disapprove	27	72	59
Most undocumented immigrants in the U.S. should be
Offered chance at legal status	22	76	56
Deported	87	11	40
Candidate trusted more to handle immigration
Trump	91	7	53
Harris	1	97	44
U.S. support for Israel is
Too strong	30	67	31
About right	39	60	30
Not strong enough	82	18	31
Candidate trusted more to handle crime and safety
Trump	95	4	52
Harris	1	98	47
Candidate trusted more to handle a crisis
Trump	95	3	51
Harris	1	97	47

==== Polling accuracy ====
Following polling inaccuracies in connection with the 2020 presidential election, pollsters took steps to avoid similar errors in 2024. Pollsters used different approaches and methodologies for the 2024 election than what they had used previously.

A report from the American Association for Public Opinion Research noted that, overall, polls correctly indicated that "the race between Kamala Harris and Donald Trump was close, in both pivotal swing states and the nation as a whole." The report noted that pre-election polls tended to underestimate Republican vote shares, although to a lesser degree than in 2016 and 2020. The polls also failed to reliably measure the preferences of Republican voters in GOP-leaning areas, Hispanic voters, and those who had voted in 2024 but not 2020.

Despite efforts by pollsters to improve survey accuracy, national polls underestimated Trump's support once again in 2024. In 2016, national polls were fairly accurate; however, Trump overperformed the polls in the Democratic-leaning Rust Belt states of Michigan, Pennsylvania, and Wisconsin, leading to his Electoral College victory. In 2020, polls had overestimated Biden's margin over Trump by approximately 4% in competitive states. In 2024, pollsters underestimated Trump's support by smaller margins than they did in 2016 and 2020, and their underestimation of that support was within the realm of a normal polling error. Going into the election, most polls showed the race to be neck and neck and within the margin of error. In every swing state, Trump outperformed his final polling numbers by approximately 3%, which is in line with a typical margin of error. Compared with the 2020 polls, the margin of error in 2024 in swing states was lower and high-quality national polls were more accurate.

Polling averages vastly underestimated Trump's strength in both safe red and safe blue states. Florida and Texas were both projected to go for Trump by about 7%; he won each of them by about 13%. Pollster Ann Selzer released a poll in Iowa that had Harris winning the state by 3%, only for Trump to take the state by 13%. On the other hand, New Jersey was projected to be a safe state for Harris but most news stations waited until 90% of the vote was in before calling it for her, as she was only leading by 5%.

== Debates ==
Biden and Trump agreed to hold debates on CNN on June 27 and ABC News on September 10. Biden and Trump debated on June 27, 2024, in Atlanta, Georgia. After Biden suspended his re-election campaign on July 21, 2024, Harris became the Democratic nominee and debated Trump on September 10, 2024, in Philadelphia, Pennsylvania.

== Results ==
Joint session of Congress certifying the election results alongside Kamala Harris; January 6, 2025

Trump won the Electoral College with 312 electoral votes to Harris' 226. He prevailed in all of the seven swing states (Pennsylvania, Georgia, North Carolina, Michigan, Arizona, Wisconsin, and Nevada). In addition, Trump won the national popular vote with a plurality of 49.8%; Harris received 48.3%.

Cedric Richmond, co-chair the Harris campaign, announced on election night that Harris would not be speaking as originally planned. In the early hours of November 6, the day after the election, Trump was projected to win the election, and he declared victory at his Mar-a-Lago estate. Harris later conceded to Trump via a phone call, and publicly conceded the election to Trump that afternoon during a speech at Howard University.

=== Electoral results ===
Candidates are listed individually below if they received more than 0.1% of the popular vote. Popular vote totals are from the Federal Election Commission report.

Electoral results
Presidential candidate	Party	Home state	Popular vote		Electoral vote	Running mate		
Presidential candidate	Party	Home state	Count	Percentage	Electoral vote	Vice-presidential candidate	Home state	Electoral vote
Donald Trump	Republican	Florida	77,302,580	49.80%	312	JD Vance	Ohio	312
Kamala Harris	Democratic	California	75,017,613	48.32%	226	Tim Walz	Minnesota	226
Jill Stein	Green	Massachusetts	862,049	0.56%	0	Butch Ware	California	0
Robert F. Kennedy Jr.	Independent	California	756,393	0.49%	0	Nicole Shanahan	California	0
Chase Oliver	Libertarian	Georgia	650,126	0.42%	0	Mike ter Maat	Virginia	0
Claudia de la Cruz	Socialism & Liberation	New York	171,786	0.11%	0	Karina Garcia	California	0
Other			477,755	0.30%	—	Other		—
Total			155,238,302	100%	538			538
Needed to win					270			270

Popular vote
Trump	49.80%
Harris	48.32%
Stein	0.56%
Kennedy	0.49%
Oliver	0.42%
de la Cruz	0.11%
Others	0.30%

Electoral vote
Trump	57.99%
Harris	42.01%

=== Results by state ===
Final reports as compiled from the certified vote totals of each state or district.

Legend
States won by Trump/Vance
States won by Harris/Walz
EV	Electoral votes
†	At-large results (for Maine and Nebraska, which both split electoral votes)

State or district	Trump/Vance Republican			Harris/Walz Democratic			Stein/Ware Green			Kennedy/Shanahan Independent			Oliver/Maat Libertarian			Others			Margin		Margin swing (Note: Percentage point difference in margin from the 2020 election.)	Total votes
State or district	Votes	%	EV	Votes	%	EV	Votes	%	EV	Votes	%	EV	Votes	%	EV	Votes	%	EV	Votes	%	%	Total votes
Alabama	1,462,616	64.57%	9	772,412	34.10%	–	4,319	0.19%	–	12,075	0.53%	–	4,930	0.22%	–	8,738	0.39%	–	690,204	30.47%	5.01%	2,265,090
Alaska	184,458	54.54%	3	140,026	41.41%	–	2,342	0.69%	–	5,670	1.68%	–	3,040	0.90%	–	2,641	0.78%	–	44,432	13.13%	3.07%	338,177
Arizona	1,770,242	52.22%	11	1,582,860	46.69%	–	18,319	0.54%	–	–	–	–	17,898	0.53%	–	842	0.02%	–	187,382	5.53%	5.84%	3,390,161
Arkansas	759,241	64.20%	6	396,905	33.56%	–	4,275	0.36%	–	13,255	1.12%	–	5,715	0.48%	–	3,285	0.28%	–	362,336	30.64%	3.02%	1,182,676
California	6,081,697	38.33%	–	9,276,179	58.47%	54	167,814	1.06%	–	197,645	1.25%	–	66,662	0.42%	–	75,478	0.48%	–	−3,194,482	−20.14%	9.02%	15,865,475
Colorado	1,377,441	43.14%	–	1,728,159	54.13%	10	17,344	0.54%	–	35,623	1.12%	–	21,439	0.67%	–	12,739	0.40%	–	−350,718	−10.99%	2.51%	3,192,745
Connecticut	736,918	41.89%	–	992,053	56.40%	7	14,281	0.81%	–	8,448	0.48%	–	6,729	0.38%	–	581	0.03%	–	−255,135	−14.51%	5.56%	1,759,010
Delaware	214,351	41.79%	–	289,758	56.49%	3	914	0.18%	–	4,636	0.90%	–	2,038	0.40%	–	1,215	0.24%	–	−75,407	−14.70%	4.27%	512,912
D.C.	21,076	6.47%	–	294,185	90.28%	3	–	–	–	2,778	0.85%	–	–	–	–	7,830	2.40%	–	−273,109	−83.81%	2.94%	325,869
Florida	6,110,125	56.09%	30	4,683,038	42.99%	–	43,155	0.40%	–	–	–	–	31,972	0.29%	–	25,462	0.23%	–	1,427,087	13.10%	9.74%	10,893,752
Georgia	2,663,117	50.72%	16	2,548,017	48.53%	–	18,229	0.35%	–	–	–	–	20,684	0.39%	–	858	0.02%	–	115,100	2.20%	2.43%	5,250,905
Hawaii	193,661	37.48%	–	313,044	60.59%	4	4,387	0.85%	–	–	–	–	2,733	0.53%	–	2,876	0.56%	–	−119,383	−23.11%	6.35%	516,701
Idaho	605,246	66.87%	4	274,972	30.38%	–	2,973	0.33%	–	12,812	1.42%	–	4,462	0.49%	–	4,592	0.51%	–	330,274	36.49%	5.72%	905,057
Illinois	2,449,079	43.47%	–	3,062,863	54.37%	19	31,023	0.55%	–	80,426	1.43%	–	3,510	0.06%	–	6,409	0.11%	–	−613,784	−10.90%	6.09%	5,633,310
Indiana	1,720,347	58.58%	11	1,163,603	39.62%	–	–	–	–	29,325	1.00%	–	20,425	0.70%	–	2,977	0.10%	–	556,744	18.96%	2.89%	2,936,677
Iowa	927,019	55.73%	6	707,278	42.52%	–	–	–	–	13,122	0.79%	–	7,218	0.43%	–	8,869	0.53%	–	219,741	13.21%	5.01%	1,663,506
Kansas	758,802	57.16%	6	544,853	41.04%	–	–	–	–	16,322	1.23%	–	7,614	0.57%	–	–	–	–	213,949	16.12%	1.48%	1,327,591
Kentucky	1,337,494	64.47%	8	704,043	33.94%	–	7,566	0.36%	–	16,769	0.81%	–	6,422	0.31%	–	2,236	0.11%	–	633,451	30.53%	4.59%	2,074,530
Louisiana	1,208,505	60.22%	8	766,870	38.21%	–	7,138	0.36%	–	6,641	0.3%	–	6,835	0.34%	–	10,986	0.55%	–	441,635	22.01%	3.40%	2,006,975
Maine †	377,977	45.46%	–	435,652	52.40%	2	8,967	1.08%	–	–	–	–	5,286	0.64%	–	3,493	0.42%	–	−57,675	−6.94%	2.13%	831,375
ME-1	165,214	38.09%	–	258,863	59.69%	1	4,828	1.11%	–	–	–	–	2,802	0.65%	–	2,002	0.46%	–	−93,649	−21.60%	1.49% (Note: District boundaries slightly changed.)	433,709
ME-2	212,763	53.50%	1	176,789	44.46%	–	4,139	1.04%	–	–	–	–	2,484	0.62%	–	1,491	0.37%	–	35,974	9.05%	1.61%	397,666
Maryland	1,035,550	34.08%	–	1,902,577	62.62%	10	33,134	1.09%	–	28,819	0.95%	–	15,570	0.51%	–	22,684	0.75%	–	−867,027	−28.54%	4.67%	3,038,334
Massachusetts	1,251,303	36.02%	–	2,126,518	61.22%	11	26,545	0.76%	–	–	–	–	17,735	0.51%	–	51,567	1.48%	–	−875,215	−25.20%	8.26%	3,473,668
Michigan	2,816,636	49.73%	15	2,736,533	48.31%	–	44,607	0.79%	–	26,785	0.47%	–	22,440	0.40%	–	17,185	0.30%	–	80,103	1.42%	4.20%	5,664,186
Minnesota	1,519,032	46.68%	–	1,656,979	50.92%	10	16,275	0.50%	–	24,001	0.74%	–	15,155	0.47%	–	22,478	0.69%	–	−137,947	−4.24%	2.87%	3,253,920
Mississippi	747,744	60.89%	6	466,668	38.00%	–	1,873	0.15%	–	5,387	0.44%	–	2,536	0.21%	–	3,800	0.31%	–	281,076	22.89%	6.34%	1,228,008
Missouri	1,751,986	58.49%	10	1,200,599	40.08%	–	17,135	0.57%	–	–	–	–	23,876	0.80%	–	1,731	0.06%	–	551,387	18.41%	3.02%	2,995,327
Montana	352,079	58.39%	4	231,906	38.46%	–	2,878	0.48%	–	11,825	1.96%	–	4,275	0.71%	–	27	0.004%	–	120,173	19.93%	3.56%	602,990
Nebraska †	564,816	59.32%	2	369,995	38.86%	–	2,887	0.30%	–	–	–	–	6,399	0.67%	–	8,085	0.85%	–	194,821	20.46%	1.40%	952,182
NE-1	177,666	55.49%	1	136,153	42.52%	–	1,011	0.32%	–	–	–	–	2,420	0.76%	–	2,944	0.92%	–	41,513	12.96%	-1.96%	320,194
NE-2	148,905	46.73%	–	163,541	51.32%	1	1,110	0.35%	–	–	–	–	2,001	0.63%	–	3,089	0.97%	–	-14,636	-4.59%	1.91%	318,646
NE-3	238,245	76.03%	1	70,301	22.44%	–	766	0.24%	–	–	–	–	1,978	0.63%	–	2,052	0.65%	–	167,944	53.60%	0.58%	313,342
Nevada	751,205	50.59%	6	705,197	47.49%	–	–	–	–	–	–	–	6,059	0.41%	–	22,379	1.51%	–	46,008	3.10%	5.49%	1,484,840
New Hampshire	395,523	47.87%	–	418,488	50.65%	4	3,680	0.45%	–	–	–	–	4,425	0.54%	–	4,073	0.49%	–	−22,965	−2.78%	4.57%	826,189
New Jersey	1,968,215	46.06%	–	2,220,713	51.97%	14	39,041	0.91%	–	23,479	0.55%	–	10,500	0.25%	–	10,777	0.25%	–	−252,498	−5.91%	10.03%	4,272,725
New Mexico	423,391	45.85%	–	478,802	51.85%	5	4,611	0.50%	–	9,553	1.03%	–	3,745	0.41%	–	3,301	0.36%	–	−55,411	−6.00%	4.79%	923,403
New York	3,578,899	43.31%	–	4,619,195	55.91%	28	46,698	0.57%	–	–	–	–	5,338	0.06%	–	12,365	0.15%	–	−1,040,296	−12.60%	10.53%	8,262,495
North Carolina	2,898,423	50.86%	16	2,715,375	47.65%	–	24,762	0.43%	–	–	–	–	22,125	0.39%	–	38,456	0.67%	–	183,048	3.21%	1.86%	5,699,141
North Dakota	246,505	66.96%	3	112,327	30.51%	–	–	–	–	–	–	–	6,227	1.69%	–	3,096	0.84%	–	134,178	36.45%	3.11%	368,155
Ohio	3,180,116	55.14%	17	2,533,699	43.93%	–	–	–	–	–	–	–	28,200	0.49%	–	25,773	0.45%	–	646,417	11.21%	3.18%	5,767,788
Oklahoma	1,036,213	66.16%	7	499,599	31.90%	–	–	–	–	16,020	1.02%	–	9,198	0.59%	–	5,143	0.33%	–	536,614	34.26%	1.17%	1,566,173
Oregon	919,480	40.97%	–	1,240,600	55.27%	8	19,099	0.85%	–	33,733	1.50%	–	9,061	0.40%	–	22,520	1.00%	–	−321,120	−14.30%	1.79%	2,244,493
Pennsylvania	3,543,308	50.37%	19	3,423,042	48.66%	–	34,538	0.49%	–	–	–	–	33,318	0.47%	–	24,526	0.35%	–	120,266	1.71%	2.87%	7,058,732
Rhode Island	214,406	41.76%	–	285,156	55.54%	4	2,900	0.56%	–	5,045	0.98%	–	1,617	0.31%	–	4,262	0.83%	–	−70,750	−13.78%	7.00%	513,386
South Carolina	1,483,747	58.23%	9	1,028,452	40.36%	–	8,117	0.32%	–	–	–	–	12,669	0.50%	–	15,155	0.59%	–	455,295	17.87%	6.19%	2,548,140
South Dakota	272,081	63.43%	3	146,859	34.24%	–	–	–	–	7,204	1.68%	–	2,778	0.65%	–	–	–	–	125,222	29.19%	3.03%	428,922
Tennessee	1,966,865	64.19%	11	1,056,265	34.47%	–	8,967	0.29%	–	21,535	0.70%	–	–	–	–	10,310	0.34%	–	910,600	29.72%	6.51%	3,063,942
Texas	6,393,597	56.14%	40	4,835,250	42.46%	–	82,701	0.73%	–	–	–	–	68,557	0.60%	–	8,569	0.08%	–	1,558,347	13.68%	8.10%	11,388,674
Utah	883,818	59.38%	6	562,566	37.79%	–	8,222	0.55%	–	–	–	–	16,902	1.14%	–	16,986	1.14%	–	321,252	21.59%	1.11%	1,488,494
Vermont	119,395	32.32%	–	235,791	63.83%	3	893	0.24%	–	5,905	1.60%	–	1,828	0.49%	–	5,610	1.52%	–	−116,396	−31.51%	3.90%	369,422
Virginia	2,075,085	46.05%	–	2,335,395	51.83%	13	34,888	0.77%	–	–	–	–	19,814	0.44%	–	40,759	0.90%	–	−260,310	−5.78%	4.35%	4,505,941
Washington	1,530,923	39.01%	–	2,245,849	57.23%	12	29,754	0.76%	–	54,868	1.40%	–	16,428	0.42%	–	46,421	1.18%	–	−714,926	−18.22%	0.98%	3,924,243
West Virginia	533,556	69.97%	4	214,309	28.10%	–	2,531	0.33%	–	8,947	1.17%	–	3,047	0.40%	–	192	0.03%	–	319,247	41.87%	2.94%	762,582
Wisconsin	1,697,626	49.60%	10	1,668,229	48.74%	–	12,275	0.36%	–	17,740	0.52%	–	10,511	0.31%	–	16,537	0.48%	–	29,397	0.86%	1.49%	3,422,918
Wyoming	192,633	71.60%	3	69,527	25.84%	–	–	–	–	–	–	–	4,193	1.56%	–	2,695	1.00%	–	123,106	45.76%	2.38%	269,048
Total	77,302,580	49.80%	312	75,017,613	48.32%	226	862,049	0.56%	–	756,393	0.49%	–	650,126	0.42%	–	649,541	0.42%	–	2,284,967	1.48%	5.94%	155,238,302
	Trump/Vance Republican			Harris/Walz Democratic			Stein/Ware Green			Kennedy/Shanahan Independent			Oliver/Maat Libertarian			Others			Margin		Margin swing	Total votes

==== States that flipped from Democratic to Republican ====
- Arizona
- Georgia
- Michigan
- Nevada
- Pennsylvania
- Wisconsin

=== Close states ===
The seven swing states in the 2024 election were the Rust Belt states of Wisconsin, Michigan, and Pennsylvania, as well as the Sun Belt states of Arizona, Georgia, Nevada, and North Carolina.

States where the margin of victory was under 1 percentage point (10 electoral votes; all won by Trump):

1. Wisconsin, 0.86% (29,397 votes) – 10 electoral votes

States/districts where the margin of victory was between 1 and 5 percentage points (87 electoral votes; 72 won by Trump, 15 won by Harris):

1. Michigan, 1.42% (80,103 votes) – 15 electoral votes
2. Pennsylvania, 1.71% (120,266 votes) – 19 electoral votes (tipping-point state)
3. Georgia, 2.20% (115,100 votes) – 16 electoral votes
4. New Hampshire, 2.78% (22,965 votes) – 4 electoral votes
5. Nevada, 3.10% (46,008 votes) – 6 electoral votes
6. North Carolina, 3.21% (183,046 votes) – 16 electoral votes
7. Minnesota, 4.24% (137,947 votes) – 10 electoral votes
8. Nebraska's 2nd congressional district, 4.59% (14,636 votes) – 1 electoral vote

States/districts where the margin of victory was between 5% and 10% (46 electoral votes; 12 won by Trump, 34 by Harris):

1. Arizona, 5.53% (187,382 votes) – 11 electoral votes
2. Virginia, 5.78% (260,310 votes) – 13 electoral votes
3. New Jersey, 5.91% (252,498 votes) – 14 electoral votes
4. New Mexico, 6.00% (55,411 votes) – 5 electoral votes
5. Maine, 6.94% (57,514 votes) – 2 electoral votes
6. Maine's 2nd congressional district, 9.03% (33,297 votes) – 1 electoral vote

Red denotes states or congressional districts won by Republican Donald Trump; Blue denotes those won by Democrat Kamala Harris.

=== County statistics ===
Counties and county-equivalents with highest percentage of Democratic vote:

1. District of Columbia – 90.28% (Note: The District of Columbia is not a state or a county, but a district with three electoral votes.)
2. Prince George's County, Maryland – 85.90%
3. Petersburg, Virginia – 85.52% (Note: Petersburg, Virginia is not a state or a county, but an independent city.)
4. Baltimore, Maryland – 84.55% (Note: Baltimore, Maryland is not a state or a county, but an independent city.)
5. Oglala Lakota County, South Dakota – 83.83%

Counties with highest percentage of Republican vote:

1. Grant County, Nebraska – 95.90%
2. Roberts County, Texas – 95.63%
3. Borden County, Texas – 95.61%
4. King County, Texas – 95.56%
5. Hayes County, Nebraska – 95.55%

=== Maps ===
Results by vote share in each state. Darker shades denote a higher vote share for the winning candidate. This map does not depict the results in Maine or Nebraska's congressional districts, which vote by congressional district and not at-large.

Results by margin of victory in each state (Note: In Maine and Nebraska, electoral votes are allocated by congressional district, with two votes going to the state at-large. The insets in those states illustrate this distribution and have no geographical significance.)

A discontinuous cartogram of the 2024 United States presidential election, scaled by their Electoral College contribution

A discretized cartogram of the 2024 United States presidential election using hexagons

Results by county, shaded by winner (Note: County equivalents are used in Alaska and Louisiana. The District of Columbia has no primary subdivisions.)

Results by county, shaded by winner's vote share

Results by county flips from 2020 to the 2024 presidential election

Swing (Note: The term "swing" refers to the shift in county margins from the 2020 presidential election to the 2024 presidential election.) in county margins from 2020 to the 2024 presidential election

Trend (Note: The term "trend" refers to the swing in county vote margins relative to the national swing in the popular vote.) in county margins from 2020 to the 2024 presidential election

Margin swing in each state from 2020 to the 2024 presidential election

Results by congressional district, shaded by winner

Third place winners

== Analysis of results ==
Trump won the 2024 election with 58% of the electoral college—placing the win in approximately the 28th percentile of all presidential elections.

Trump's 1.5% margin of victory in 2024 (shown in chart) places his victory in the 20th percentile of presidential election victory margins since 1828.

Vote margin swing by state 2020 to 2024. No state shifted Democratic. Relative to 2016, 28 states shifted to the right by 2024, with an average shift relative to 2016 of 1 point.

Trump is the first president since Grover Cleveland in 1892 to win non-consecutive terms. 2024 also marked the first time since 1892 that the incumbent party had lost in each of three consecutive presidential elections. This was the first time since 1980 that the Democrats were voted out after a single four-year term. This was also the second consecutive election in which the incumbent party had lost after a single four-year term.

Trump is the first Republican to win the popular vote since George W. Bush's election in 2004; Bush and Trump are also the only two presidents who won the Electoral College while losing the popular vote in one election who then went on to win both the Electoral College and the popular vote in a subsequent election. Trump is also the first non-incumbent Republican to have won the popular vote since George H. W. Bush in 1988. Trump won a 1.48% margin of victory. While winning the popular vote, Trump did not win a majority of the popular vote; he is the first winning presidential candidate since Bill Clinton in 1996 to win the popular vote with a plurality and also the first Republican since Richard Nixon in 1968 to do so. After Cleveland in 1884 and 1892, Woodrow Wilson in 1912 and 1916, and Clinton in 1992 and 1996, Trump became the fourth president since 1880 to win two presidential elections and receive less than 50% of the popular vote in both presidential election victories. (Note: In every presidential election from 1788 through 1828, multiple state legislatures selected their presidential electors by discretionary appointment rather than by popular vote, while the South Carolina General Assembly did so in every presidential election through 1860, and the Florida Legislature and the Colorado General Assembly selected their presidential electors by discretionary appointment in 1868 and 1876 respectively.) (Note: Seven presidents have won at least two presidential elections since 1880 and received more than 50% of the popular vote in at least one presidential election victory: William McKinley in 1896 and 1900; Franklin D. Roosevelt in 1932, 1936, 1940, and 1944; Dwight D. Eisenhower in 1952 and 1956; Richard Nixon in 1968 and 1972; Ronald Reagan in 1980 and 1984; George W. Bush in 2000 and 2004; and Barack Obama in 2008 and 2012.) Trump is the first presidential candidate since Barack Obama in 2012 to win a second term in the White House and also the first Republican since George W. Bush in 2004 to do so. Trump is also the first presidential candidate since Nixon in 1968 to successfully make a political comeback by winning an election after losing a previous one.

Trump carried 31 of 50 states. Trump is the first Republican presidential candidate to win Nevada since George W. Bush in 2004.

The 2024 presidential election was the first presidential election since 1976 in which all 50 states and Washington, D.C. shifted towards the same party. Approximately 90% of counties swung towards Trump between the 2020 and 2024 elections, encompassing both rural and urban areas. The 2024 election was the first presidential election since 1932 in which the losing candidate failed to flip a single county. Even among states that voted heavily for Biden in the 2020 election, Trump's gains were significant. The states of New York and New Jersey swung over ten points toward Trump, and Trump also made gains in Harris' home state of California. However, relative to 2016, only 28 states shifted to the right by 2024, with an average shift relative to 2016 of 1 point.

While Trump made gains among young voters compared to Republicans in recent presidential elections, especially among young men, exit polls found Harris won young voters by 54 to 51 percent of voters under 30. However, Millennials and Generation Z constituted a minority of the voting public. Voters 44 years of age or younger (born in 1980 or later) were estimated by the exit poll to comprise 37% of the electorate. Almost all demographic groups (including African-Americans, Hispanic-Americans, and Asian-Americans) swung towards Trump from the 2020 election; the exceptions to this trend included non-religious voters, LGBT voters, White women with college degrees, Black women, and voters making over $100,000 a year. According to exit polls, Harris's strongest income demographic consisted of voters making over $200,000 a year; she won those voters by a margin of 52–46%.

Higher educational attainment is strongly correlated with higher income in the United States. In particular, those with at least a bachelor's degree have a median household income over $100,000 a year. Having a postgraduate degree leads to even higher income. Nearly all members of both parties in the 118th Congress (2023–2025) had a college degree, unlike the majority of American adults. Post-election research by the Brookings Institution found that while Trump performed better than expected among some minority voters, particularly Latino or Hispanic voters, the Republican Party had "hardly" created a "multiracial coalition", as had been suggested by "Republican-leaning" pundits. Brookings argued that this shift represented only a small deviation from long-term patterns among minority voters which was largely based on economic concerns, noting that Harris voters were still much more racially diverse than Trump voters, and saying that it was "much too soon to pronounce that the GOP has undergone a multiracial transformation."

Trump is the oldest person to win a presidential election, at age 78 surpassing Biden's 2020 record of doing so at age 77; Trump is also the first former president to win a state since Theodore Roosevelt in 1912. This was the first election since 1944 in which a presidential candidate won two elections with different vice presidential candidates; Trump replaced his 2016 and 2020 running mate, Mike Pence, with Vance.

== Aftermath ==
A Voice of America report on Trump's victory

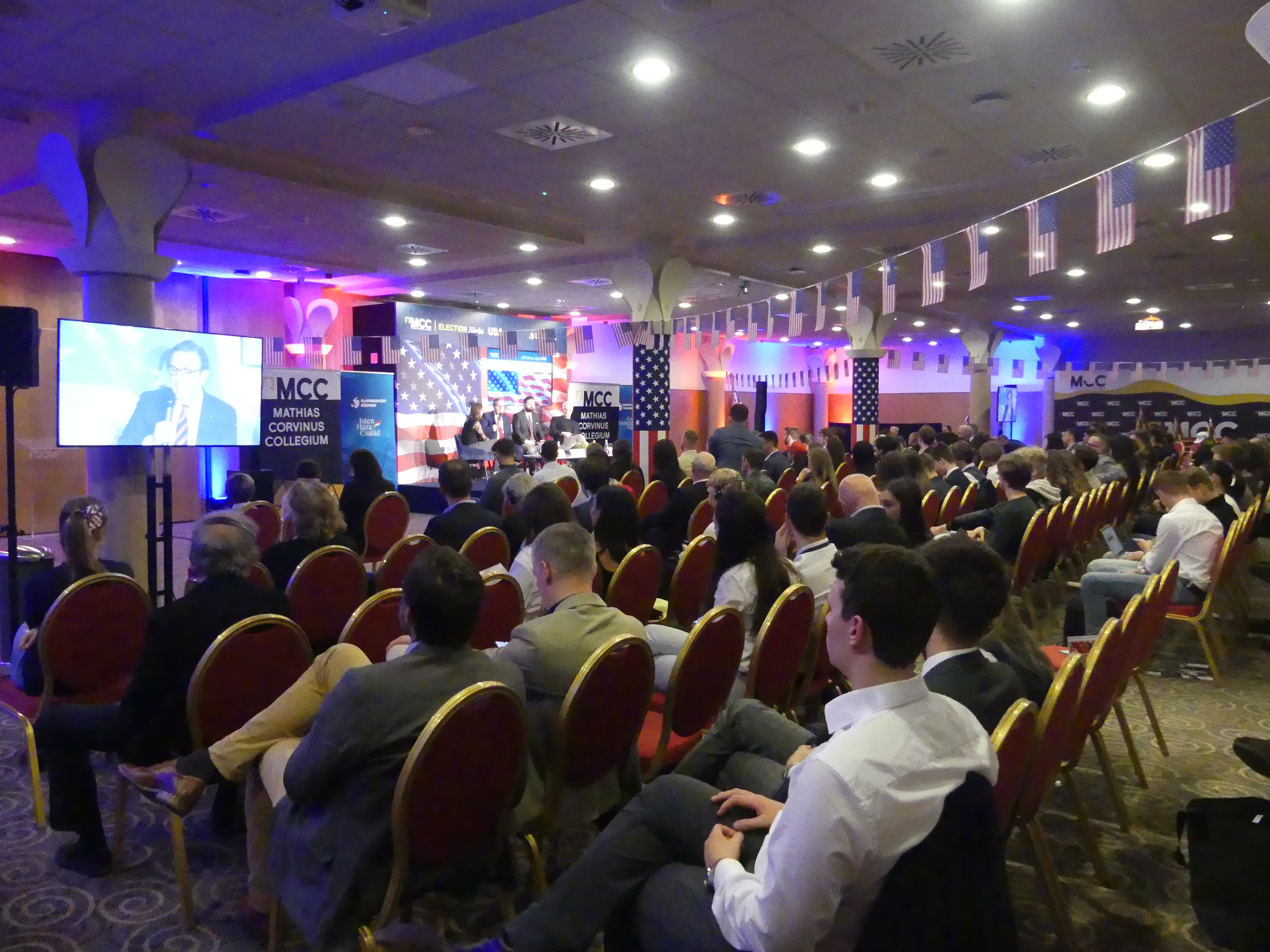
MCC-CFR Election Night with Peter Boghossian, Gladden Pappin, and Miklós Szánthó

=== Reactions ===
Crisis services for the LGBTQ+ community saw a sharp increase in usage during the election week. The Trevor Project's crisis lines saw a 125% increase since around midnight on election night according to a statement by CEO Jaymes Black on November 6, and followed an about 200% increase in election related conversations that had been seen November 3–4. By November 8, it was reported that the organization saw an overall increase by 700%. The Crisis Text Line also reported that 56% of their users reported as LGBTQ+ on election day.

The Latitude Group, an investment migration firm that assists wealthy Americans in securing foreign citizenship, saw a 200× jump in inquiries following the election.

==== Political ====
Harris conceded victory to Trump on November 6.

Democrats had differing views on why Harris lost the election. Vermont Senator Bernie Sanders blamed Democrats for having abandoned the working class. Democratic National Committee chair Jaime Harrison dismissed Sanders' criticism. Former House Speaker Nancy Pelosi also disagreed with Sanders, blaming the party's loss on Biden's late exit and the lack of an open Democratic primary.

Senator Chris Murphy (D-CT) believed that the Democrats could not connect to a large number of voters and should embrace populism going forward. Representative Ritchie Torres (D-NY) attributed Trump's victory to public discontent over inflation and immigration; he asserted that Harris ran an effective campaign, but could not overcome a difficult electoral environment.

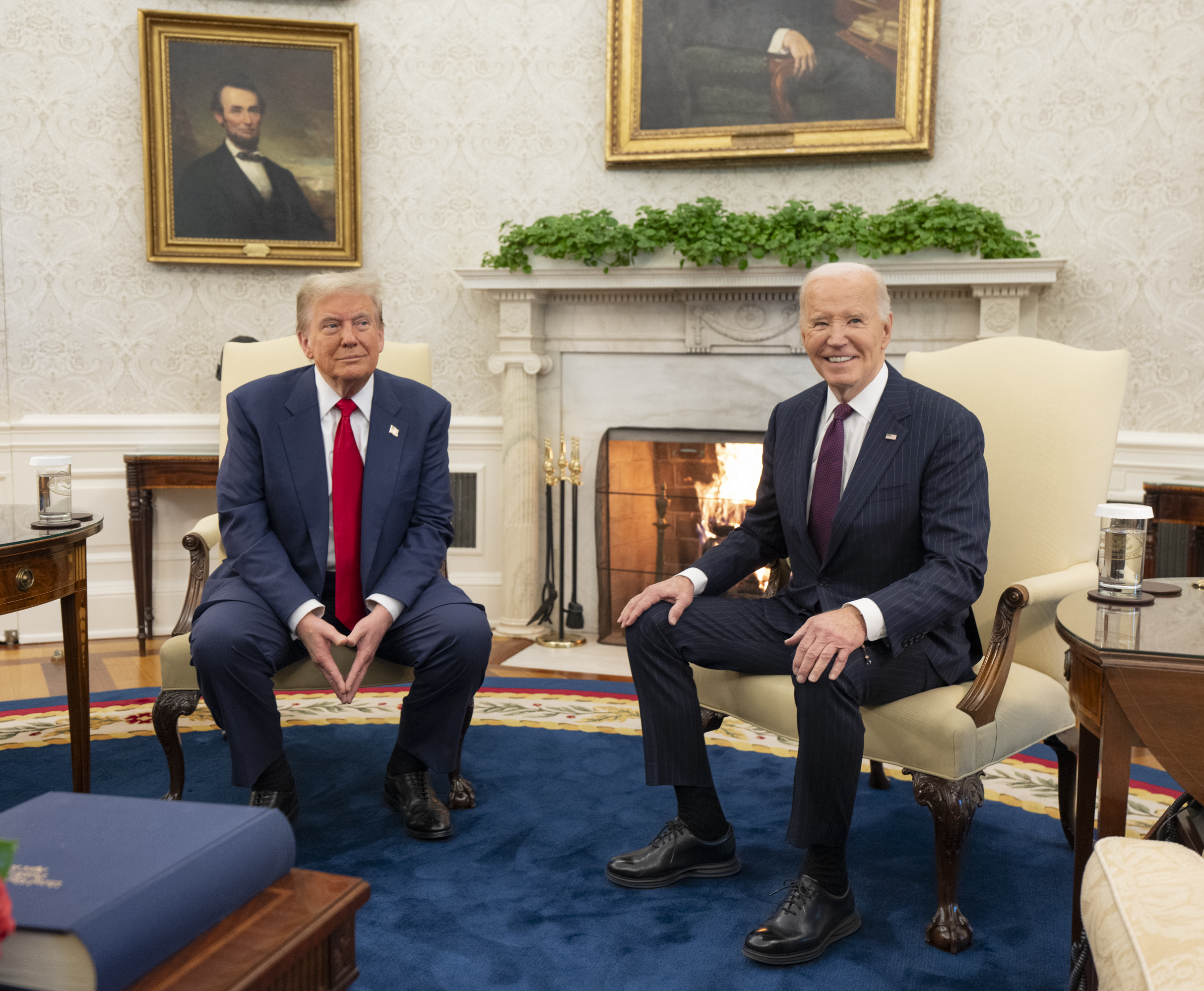
President Joe Biden (right) and President-elect Donald Trump (left) meet in the Oval Office of the White House as part of the presidential transition.

In June 2026, progressive political commentator Ta-Nehisi Coates published a Vanity Fair article entitled Did Kamala Harris's Silence on Gaza Cost Her the White House? He argued the US adhered to a "survivalist theory of democracy" and that there was a "bipartisan acceptance of innocent death as the cost of doing business in the Muslim and Arab world," including with respect to the Gaza war and genocide. He said this led to a "casual contempt" for Democrat leaders. He also referenced how the Democratic Party had refused to allow a Palestinian American to speak at the 2024 Democratic National Convention. He also argued the election was a matter of lesser-evil voting. Journalist Joy Reid claimed many African Americans could not connect with Harris due to "her sort of political inability to speak directly to the genocide."

==== Financial ====
Wall Street's main indexes reported record highs on the day after the election, with the Dow Jones Industrial Average up 3.57%, the S&P 500 up 2.53%, and Nasdaq up 2.95%.

==== "Stolen election" conspiracy theories ====
Following Trump's victory, some Harris supporters on X shared election denial conspiracy theories, claiming that millions of ballots were "left uncounted" and there being something "not right" with the election. Such posts falsely claiming Trump "stole" the election peaked at noon the day after at 94,000 posts per hour, with many receiving amplification and gaining over a million views each. According to Gordon Crovitz, the CEO of the media rating system NewsGuard, the phrase "Trump cheated" received 92,100 mentions on the platform from midnight until the Wednesday morning after. Besides the claims from Harris's supporters, some Trump supporters baselessly claimed the disparity between other years, the 2020 election, and a then-incomplete 2024 voting total indicated voter fraud in the 2020 election.

One major "basis" these false claims were founded upon was a claim that Biden won 20 million more votes in his prior election bid than Harris had in hers, at the time. American journalist and conspiracy theorist Wayne Madsen commented on Threads: "I'm beginning to believe our election was massively hacked just like happened a few weeks ago in the Republic of Georgia." At the time these claims were disseminated, votes were still being counted in many states. An estimate around the time using the Associated Press vote percentage total found that 16.2 million votes across 20 states and D.C. had yet to be counted. Statistical analysis of voting asserted that despite continued counting, the projections were already set and new ballots would not sway the outcomes of any of the states and D.C. The Cybersecurity and Infrastructure Security Agency director Jen Easterly refuted the false claims, and wrote in a statement that there was "no evidence of any malicious activity that had a material impact on the security or integrity of our election infrastructure". Another false claim alleges Musk used the satellite Internet constellation Starlink to change the results of the election. Chief technology officer Chip Trowbridge of voting system manufacturer Clear Ballot dismissed the claim and added that no machines used to scan voting ballots have any network connection whatsoever.

==== Text message harassment ====
Numerous Black Americans across multiple states reported receiving threatening, racist text messages the day after the election. Some of the texts referenced the incoming Trump administration, but the senders remained unknown as of November 10, 2024. Days later, several Latino and LGBTQIA students also reported receiving similar harassment through text messages and emails.

== Media analysis ==
=== Harris's loss ===
Harris's loss to Trump received substantial media analysis in the aftermath of the election. Proposed explanations for the outcome of the race included inflation, the immigration crisis, a global incumbency backlash, Biden's late exit from the race, and the lack of an open Democratic primary process. Democrats and others argued about what went wrong and how the party should move forward.

==== Electoral environment ====
According to Gallup, most factors with respect to the electoral environment favored Republicans and Trump. These included low confidence in the economy, Republicans outnumbering Democrats in party affiliation (48–45%), low national satisfaction, Republicans being favored to address the economy and immigration, and Biden's low job approval rating. Harris was viewed more favorably on character and had an advantage on some issues. No incumbent party has won when a president had below a 45% approval rating, either losing reelection (Jimmy Carter in 1980, George H. W. Bush in 1992, and Trump himself in 2020) or the incumbent party lost the White House (Hubert Humphrey in 1968).

According to exit polls, voters disapproved of Biden's performance 59–39%, and disapproved of how things were going in the United States 73–25%. Also, voters judged the economy negatively 68–32%, and said that inflation had caused them hardship 75–24%. A YouGov poll conducted from November 6–7, 2024 found that if Biden had been the Democratic nominee, Trump would have won the popular vote 49–42%. Nonpartisan election forecasters, including The Cook Political Report and Sabato's Crystal Ball, stated before the election that Biden would have been almost certain to lose.

Harris did improve compared to Biden among voters making over $100,000 a year. NBC News found that Trump made larger gains in counties with tougher housing markets.

Almost every incumbent party worldwide facing election in 2024 lost vote share, including in South Africa, India, France, the United Kingdom, and Japan. Among democracies, over 80 percent saw the incumbent party lose support compared to the last election. This is the first time this has ever happened since 1905 (when data was first recorded) and the first time in the history of democracy, as universal suffrage began in 1894.

All 50 states and the District of Columbia shifted rightward compared to 2020. Trump's gains in nearly all geographic areas and among nearly every demographic group provides strong evidence of anti-incumbent backlash. The shifts toward Trump were much less in the swing states where both campaigns focused compared to safe states. The two states with the largest shifts toward Trump, New York and New Jersey, were both won by Harris. Harris had very little room to fall in the swing states, given that Biden had won most of them by very small margins in 2020.

Statistician and election analyst Nate Silver argued before the election that the national electoral environment was difficult for Democrats. This view was also shared by The New York Times political analyst Nate Cohn. After the election, Silver felt that Harris was a replacement-level candidate who did much better than Biden would have, but was unable to separate herself from Biden's record and was negatively perceived by swing voters due to her previous positions. Amy Walter, editor of the nonpartisan The Cook Political Report, also argued that the electoral environment was inherently difficult for Harris because the top issue for voters was inflation during the Biden-Harris administration.

Ronald Brownstein of The Atlantic, who spoke with members of Harris's campaign, argued that the extent of Biden's unpopularity and public discontent with the economy proved too much for Harris to overcome. Brownstein compared the election to the 1968 presidential election (when unpopular incumbent Lyndon B. Johnson withdrew from the race and Vice President Hubert Humphrey lost to Richard Nixon) and the 1980 presidential election (when unpopular incumbent Jimmy Carter lost to Ronald Reagan due to stagflation and the 1970s energy crisis). Members of Harris' campaign stated after the election that their internal polling never showed Harris ahead of Trump and they did not believe that Harris was the favorite to win the election. David Plouffe, a senior campaign advisor to Harris, claimed that even making the race competitive was a win for Harris' staff.

The opportunity to elect Harris as the first female U.S. president proved to be less important to voters than issues like the economy and immigration. Results of VoteCast, as reported by Fox News, find that 13% of voters chose "the fact that Kamala Harris would be the first female president" as the single most important factor to their vote. Even so, polls have shown that voters support backing a female candidate while also acknowledging the challenges they might face on the campaign trail. Surveys conducted in 2023 by Pew Research Center found that respondents believed that there were several reasons why there were fewer women than men in high political offices: that women "have to do more to prove themselves" than men, that women in politics face gender discrimination, and that many Americans are not ready to elect a woman to higher office. 18% in one of the polls said that it is extremely or very important to them personally that the United States elects a woman president in their lifetime. A September 2024 AP-NORC poll found that 34% of respondents thought that the fact that Kamala Harris is a woman would help her get elected. A slightly larger 38% thought that it would hurt her, while 26% did not think it would make a difference. An AP-NORC poll from December of the same year found that about one-quarter said that it was extremely or very likely that the country would elect a woman president in their lifetime. A January 2024 Gallup poll found that 93% of Americans would vote for a generally well-qualified person for president who happened to be a woman.

===== Voter analysis =====
An Institute for Middle East Understanding (IMEU) poll conducted by YouGov from December 2024 to January 2025 found that the most important issues affecting the vote of Biden 2020 voters that did not vote for Harris were "Ending Israel's violence in Gaza" (29%), "The economy" (24%), followed by "Medicare and Social Security," (12%) "Immigration and border security," (11%) "Healthcare," (10%) and "Abortion" (9%). The survey found swing state Biden 2020 non-Harris voters ranked Gaza as less important than non-swing state voters. The survey also found that 36% of these voters would have been more likely to vote for Harris if she "had pledged to break from President Biden's policy toward Gaza by promising to withhold additional weapons to Israel for committing human rights abuses against Palestinian civilians."

====== Turnout ======
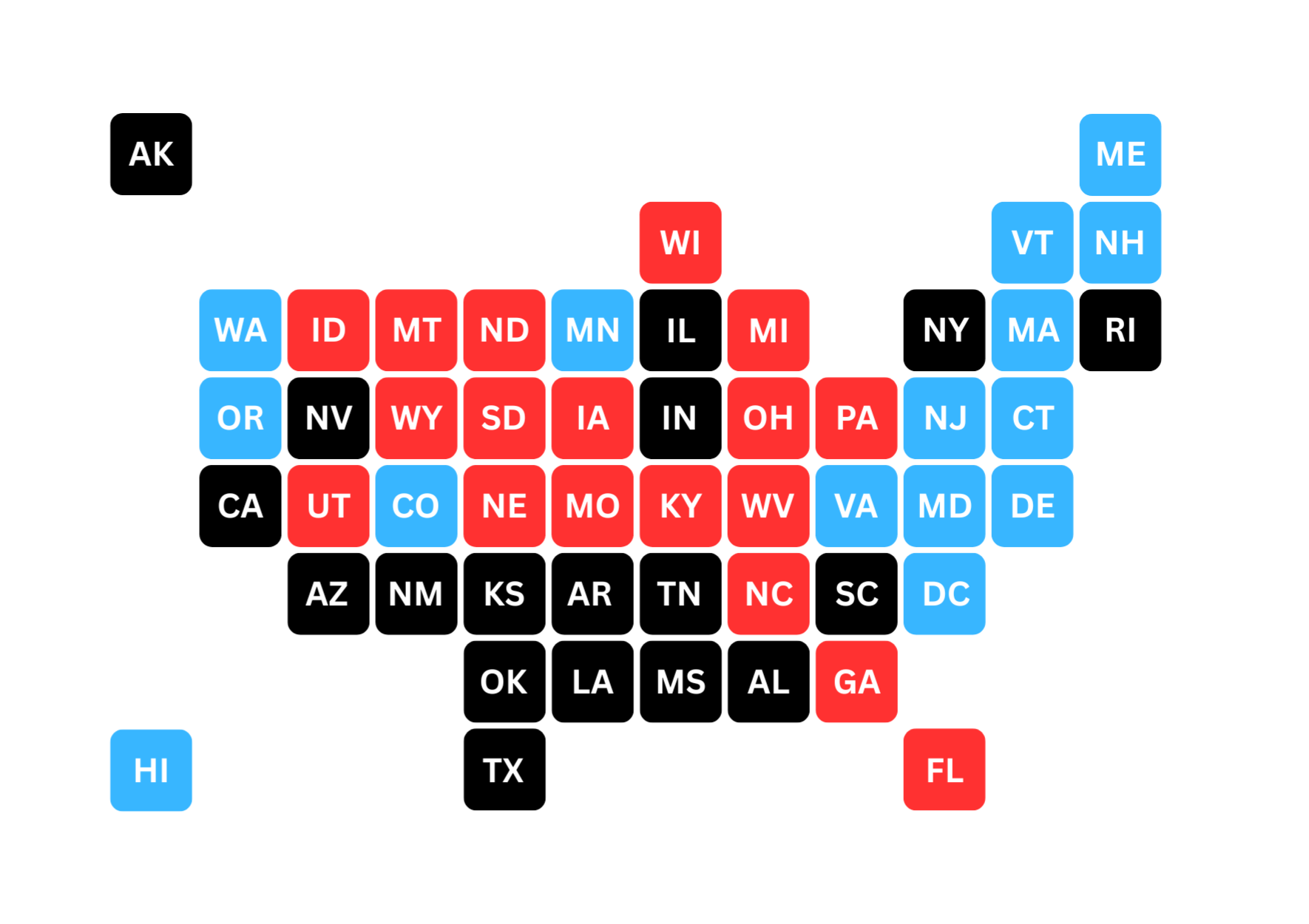
In 18 states, representing 243 electoral votes, a plurality of voters chose to stay home rather than vote for any candidate.

An analysis released by Democratic-leaning data firm Catalist in May 2025 found that Trump's victory rested on support from voters who were less engaged with politics, as well as weakened support and turnout for Harris from a range of Democratic-leaning groups. Nearly half of the 2024 electorate cast ballots in the previous four federal elections, representing an increase of nine points from 2020 and seven points from 2016, and Harris won under 50 percent of these voters, outperforming Biden's and Hillary Clinton's respective performances. In contrast, Harris won 48 percent of voters who only voted in two or fewer of the previous four federal elections, underperforming Biden and Clinton, both of whom won at least 54 percent of those voters. Harris also won less than half of voters who did not cast a vote in 2020 but did so in 2024, compared to Biden and Clinton each winning roughly 55 percent of new voters in their respective elections; Catalist considered this Democratic underperformance to be unprecedented in their history of election analysis. Jennifer Agiesta of CNN reported that new and infrequent voters in 2024 were more likely to be from Democratic-leaning groups but also less likely to have college degrees, a trait increasingly tied to Republican support.

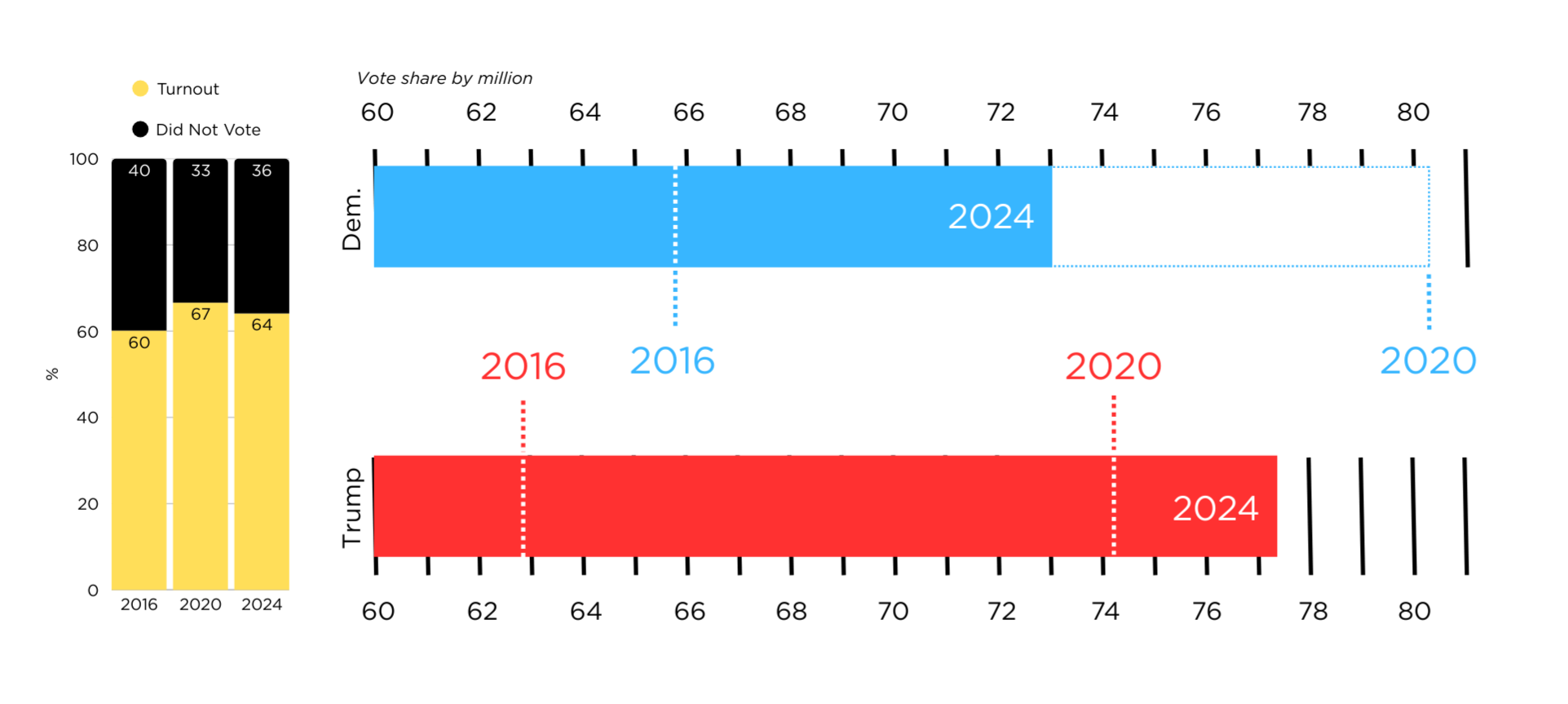
While Trump's total number of votes increased each election, Democratic support rose from 2016 to 2020 and then fell in 2024. Turnout followed Democratic support trends.

A Pew Research Center post-election analysis of voters who are listed as having voted in their state's voter turnout records who have also reported voting in a survey after the election similarly found a "more racially and ethnically diverse" electorate, one that was less engaged politically than in the four previous federal elections. More 2020 Trump voters (89%) than 2020 Biden voters (85%) also voted in 2024. 15% of those who voted for Biden in 2020 did not vote in the 2024 election. 78% of White voters supported Trump in 2024, a lower level of support for him among this group than in 2020 and 2016. Fewer Black voters supported Harris in 2024 than they did the Democratic candidates in the 2020 and 2016 elections.

==== Analyst assessments ====
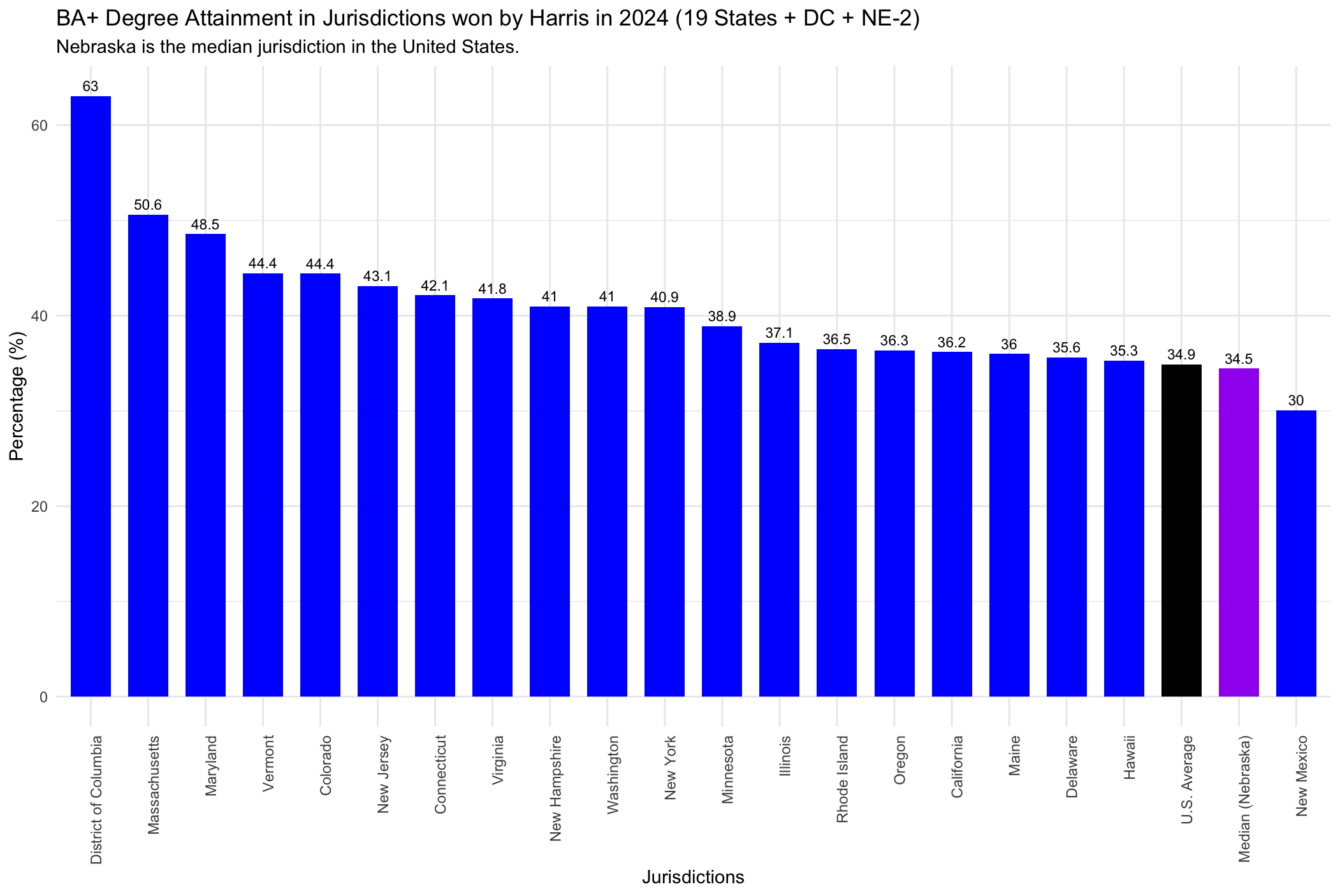
Bar plot of the percentage of the population with a bachelor's degree in the electoral jurisdictions won by Harris in the election

The Independent's Jon Sopel wrote that the most pressing issues that decided Harris's defeat were matters Biden had been perceived as a failure at by the American public; these included the fact that, as part of the global 2021–2023 inflation surge, inflation went up by 20% and real wages had not adjusted to match, and the state of the Mexico–United States border. Sopel said that by "embracing the Biden agenda, [Harris] was simply tying herself to his unpopularity".

In a Time piece, Henry M. J. Tonks tied the result to the party's prioritization of professional class workers and suburbs over working class, blue-collar voters. He argued the shift away from working-class voters had been occurring since the late 1960s in response to the Vietnam War and the growth of the tech industry. Of the electoral jurisdictions that Harris won – 19 states, DC, and Nebraska's second congressional district – all except New Mexico had above-average educational attainment.

CNN's Edward-Isaac Dovere felt that some of Harris' problems, such as difficulties with her staff, could have been solved, but other problems such as her ties with Biden could not. Dovere mused that had Biden stepped down earlier, the Democratic Party might have had the time to launch a proper primary campaign. He also mused that Walz was chosen because he could not "outshine" her, and that this reflected her "newfound confidence and her long-standing insecurity". The Economic Times cited surveys showing "broad negative sentiment" about the economy, and Harris being "relentlessly hammered" by Trump during campaigns about this. The Economic Times cited University of Richmond School of Law professor Carl Tobias' appraisal of Trump's stance on immigration winning over Harris', and mentioned how Trump had increased his support from Hispanics, especially near the Mexican–American border and in areas impacted by recent immigration. Harris campaigning at multiple events with former Republican representative Liz Cheney has been suggested as a contributing factor as to why she lost.

Los Angeles Times's Noah Bierman felt Harris could not overcome being the "turn the page" candidate, and cited former president Barack Obama's lead strategist David Axelrod, who said: "If you're the vice president of an administration people want to fire, you're way behind the eight-ball to start." Bierman wrote that besides criminal context, Trump "never followed a script, scoffed at the rules and spoke directly to the economic and cultural anxieties of the country". In The New York Times, Timothy Shenk argued that Democrats failed to articulate a vision for the future other than being against Trump and did not lean into a message of economic populism that polled best with swing voters, but also that the election looked more like a rejection of Biden than the embrace of Trump. In another New York Times article, Nate Cohn analyzed exit polls showing Trump's gains among non-white and young voters, suggesting Trump's populist message resonated with many voters previously considered part of the Democratic Party's base. Jen Psaki, who served as Biden's first press secretary, suggested that Harris focusing on Anti-Trump Republicans was not a winning strategy.

Charlie Cook, founder of the nonpartisan The Cook Political Report, said that swing voters broke in favor of Trump due to anger over inflation associated with the Biden-Harris administration, causing Trump to sweep the swing states. However, Democrats did better in down-ballot races, meaning Trump did not have a strong coattail effect. The Atlantic's Ronald Brownstein argued that the Democratic Party's success in the 2022 midterm elections, when Trump was not on the ballot, had led them to underestimate Trump's support. Democrats also performed better than Harris in down-ballot races, suggesting voters likely assigned their blame over the economy on the Biden-Harris administration rather than the Democratic Party at-large.

The BBC's Courtney Subramanian said Harris "couldn't shake the anti-Biden sentiment that permeated much of the electorate", that she "failed to deliver a convincing argument about why she should lead the country", did not state a strategy to combat economic frustrations, and failed to address widespread concerns over immigration. Vox's Nicole Narea highlighted inflation outpacing wages in certain industries, rising unemployment, and rising consumer debt and falling savings as key economic indicators that Democrats "may have missed". In another Vox article, Andrew Prokop argued Harris suffered from a worldwide backlash to incumbents over inflation, as well as her struggles unifying the party over Gaza, failing to be a change candidate, and her difficulty in defending or abandoning positions she took during her 2020 presidential run.

=== Trump's victory ===
Although many conventional metrics indicated that the American economy had recovered from the COVID-19 pandemic (wages increased and inflation was in check), and although migrant crossings at the U.S.-Mexico border had declined significantly since earlier in the Biden administration, an AP article stated that Trump was able to convince voters to support him in 2024 by promising to fix the economy and block the flow of immigrants at the border. According to exit polls, voters whose top issues were the economy and immigration largely voted for Trump.

Time's Eric Cortellessa wrote that the thesis of Trump's campaign boiled down to this simple slogan: "Max out the men and hold the women". To accomplish this goal, Trump "relentlessly" emphasized the economy and immigration. Cortellessa also mentioned Trump's minimization of his numerous controversies and his success in having his criminal trials postponed until after the election. He said that Trump's "advanced age and increasingly incoherent trail rhetoric" were taken in stride by voters, and that "much of the country read Trump's legal woes as part of a larger corrupt conspiracy to deny him, and them, power". NPR wrote that "Americans have continued to chafe at higher than pre-pandemic prices and the lack of affordable housing", and that much of the voter placed the blame "squarely" on the Biden administration. NPR said demographics played an important role in the election, with White voters going up as a share of the electorate from 67% to 71% and Trump winning 46% of Latinos. NPR also noted that polls underestimated Trump's level of support in battleground states and across the nation.

The New York Times asserted that "[Trump] made one essential bet: that his grievances would become the grievances of the MAGA movement, and then the G.O.P., and then more than half the country. It paid off." The Times added that Trump's several setbacks actually benefited his public image and approval, as "his mug shot became a best-selling shirt. His criminal conviction inspired $100 million in donations in one day. The images of him bleeding after a failed assassination attempt became the symbol of what supporters saw as a campaign of destiny."

NBC noted a Democratic strategist's contention that male voters' belief that they were "being left behind, that society doesn't have a place for them" was a major factor in men's support for Trump. The network contended that Trump's approval ratings among non-college-educated and middle-income voters, especially among Latinos and young men, showed that he had made strides in his promise to assemble a multiracial, working-class coalition. Trump increased his support from Hispanics from 2020 to 2024, especially near the Mexican–American border and in areas impacted by recent immigration.

Several observers pointed to shifting habits in how Americans consume media and a growing lack of trust in mainstream news outlets. Trump embraced alternative media through podcasts and online streamers such as Joe Rogan, Adin Ross, Theo Von, Sneako and the Nelk Boys. The New York Times reported that such avenues "presented a way for Mr. Trump to sidestep more confrontational interviews with professional journalists, where he might face tough questions, fact-checks and detailed policy debates. The influencers he met with rarely challenged Mr. Trump, and often lavished him with praise." Observers also highlighted Trump's courting of the "manosphere", a collection of what The Guardian described as "male podcasters, influencers and public figures" that "marketed themselves as free-thinking pundits who evaded the bounds of political classification". NYU marketing professor Scott Galloway said "this was the testosterone podcast election". Post-election research showed that nearly 40% of young voters got their news from social media influencers, and that a majority of those influencers leaned right.

The New York Times reported that Trump's super PAC had joined a long list of presidential campaigns that made a "technological leap or innovation" while targeting key voters. The Times highlighted the use of targeted advertising of individual undecided voters on streaming video platforms that allowed the PAC to save money, while Harris largely targeted ads on streaming platforms by geography. It reported the Trump team's findings that the undecided electorate was younger, black, and Hispanic, and that such voters largely used streaming media over traditional broadcast television.

Journalist Elizabeth Spiers argued that Trump's strong support among young white men could be attributed to his campaign "channeling what psychologists call 'hegemonic masculinity'". Spiers added that "For men unhappy with their status, this view offers a group of people to blame, which feels more tangible than blaming systemic problems like rising economic inequality and the difficulty of adapting to technological and cultural changes."

=== Viewership ===
Legend
Cable news network
Broadcast network

Total television viewers 8:00–11:00 p.m. EST
Network	Viewers
Fox News	10,300,000
MSNBC	6,000,000
ABC	5,900,000
NBC	5,500,000
CNN	5,100,000
CBS	3,600,000
Fox	2,000,000
Newsmax	950,000
FBN	897,000
NewsNation	265,000

Total cable TV viewers 6:00 p.m. to 3:00 a.m. EST
Network	Viewers
Fox News	8,600,000
MSNBC	4,300,000
CNN	3,800,000

Television viewers Age 25 to 54 8:00–11:00 p.m. EST
Network	Viewers
Fox News	3,100,000
ABC	2,300,000
NBC	2,200,000
CNN	2,200,000
MSNBC	1,800,000
CBS	1,300,000
Fox	872,000
FBN	418,000
Newsmax	153,000
NewsNation	68,000

Cable TV viewers Age 25 to 54 6:00 p.m. to 3:00 a.m. EST
Network	Viewers
Fox News	2,600,000
CNN	1,600,000
MSNBC	1,200,000

== See also ==
- 2024 United States elections
  - 2024 United States gubernatorial elections
  - 2024 United States House of Representatives elections
  - 2024 United States Senate elections
- Timeline of the 2024 United States presidential election
- Republican Party efforts to disrupt the 2024 United States presidential election
- Fundraising in the 2024 United States presidential election
