= Fundraising in the 2020 United States presidential election =

Fundraising plays a central role in many presidential campaigns, and is a key factor (others include endorsements/messaging/visits/staffers) in determining the viability of candidates. Money raised is applied for the salaries of non-volunteers in the campaign, transportation, campaign materials, media advertisements and other contingencies. Under United States law, officially declared candidates are required to file campaign finance details with the Federal Election Commission (FEC) at the end of every calendar month or quarter. Summaries of these reports are made available to the public shortly thereafter, revealing the relative financial situations of all the campaigns.

== Post-General Filings ==
Selected campaign-specific finance information from October 15, 2020 through November 23, 2020, according to the FEC.

Candidate	Money Raised	Individual Contributions (Note: Excludes self-funded contributions, as well as contributions from any political committees.)	% Unitemized (Note: Unitemized contributions are below $200.)	Loans Received	Money Spent	Cash On Hand	Total Debt	Source
Joe Biden	$112,374,093.52	$103,299,383.24	33.7%	$0.00	$272,860,138.48	$1,559,941.94	$0.00	
Donald Trump	$183,459,477.50	$142,807,180.04	63.3%	$0.00	$208,652,006.62	$18,417,435.62	$0.00	

== Pre-General Filings ==
Selected campaign-specific finance information from October 1, 2020 through October 14, 2020, according to the FEC.

Candidate	Money Raised	Individual Contributions	% Unitemized	Loans Received	Money Spent	Cash On Hand	Total Debt	Source
Joe Biden	$130,013,969.71	$70,040,659.49	35.8%	$0.00	$145,227,282.18	$162,045,986.90	$0.00	
Donald Trump	$43,582,193.49	$43,351,464.21	30.9%	$0.00	$63,086,991.61	$43,609,964.74	$1,222,022.11	

== September 2020 ==
Selected campaign-specific finance information through September 30, 2020, according to the FEC.

Candidate	Money Raised	Individual Contributions	% Unitemized	Loans Received	Money Spent	Cash On Hand	Total Debt	Source
Joe Biden	$281,630,846.85	$163,578,908.14	33.6%	$0.00	$284,997,958.56	$177,259,299.37	$0.00	
Donald Trump	$81,316,675.57	$68,362,769.79	26.4%	$0.00	$139,293,985.71	$63,114,762.86	$1,361,669.81	

== August 2020 ==
Selected campaign-specific finance information through August 31, 2020, according to the FEC.

Candidate	Money Raised	Individual Contributions	% Unitemized	Loans Received	Money Spent	Cash On Hand	Total Debt	Source
Joe Biden	$212,181,474.13	$159,816,208.43	40.4%	$0.00	$130,356,943.29	$180,626,411.08	$0.00	
Donald Trump	$61,750,338.20	$45,982,615.28	36.5%	$0.00	$61,204,784.71	$121,096,473.00	$902,625.69	

== July 2020 ==
Selected campaign-specific finance information through July 31, 2020, according to the FEC.

Candidate	Money Raised	Individual Contributions	% Unitemized	Loans Received	Money Spent	Cash On Hand	Total Debt	Source
Donald Trump	$72,043,919.83	$32,067,973.19	50.7%	$0.00	$64,517,980.90	$120,550,919.51	$250,289.80	
Joe Biden	$49,559,775.33	$48,227,331.54	42.1%	$0.00	$59,675,371.23	$98,801,880.24	$0.00	

== June 2020 ==
Selected campaign-specific finance information through June 30, 2020, according to the FEC.

Candidate	Money Raised	Individual Contributions	% Unitemized	Loans Received	Money Spent	Cash On Hand	Total Debt	Source
Joe Biden	$63,415,235.34	$63,235,084.21	50.7%	$0.00	$36,926,212.05	$108,917,476.14	$0.00	
Donald Trump	$55,241,473.36	$29,759,500.38	39.9%	$0.00	$50,339,702.29	$113,024,980.58	$629,582.32	

== May 2020 ==
Selected campaign-specific finance information through May 31, 2020, according to the FEC.

Candidate	Money Raised	Individual Contributions	% Unitemized	Loans Received	Money Spent	Cash On Hand	Total Debt	Source
Joe Biden	$36,995,099.74	$36,915,763.91	47.2%	$0.00	$11,669,246.73	$82,428,452.85	$0.00	
Donald Trump	$24,945,223.43	$14,103,529.58	38.2%	$0.00	$24,501,838.40	$108,123,209.51	$240,512.39	

== April 2020 ==
Selected campaign-specific finance information through April 30, 2020, according to the FEC.

Democrats April 2020

Candidate	Money Raised	Individual Contributions	% Unitemized	Loans Received	Money Spent	Cash On Hand	Total Debt	Source
Joe Biden	$43,652,132.17	$43,559,018.91	36.8%	$0.00	$12,936,396.85	$57,102,599.84	$0.00	
Bernie Sanders	$3,353,945.62	$1,226,735.12	48.5%	$0.00	$10,739,653.28	$8790374.30	$0.00	

Republicans April 2020

Candidate	Money Raised	Individual Contributions	% Unitemized	Loans Received	Money Spent	Cash On Hand	Total Debt	Source
Donald Trump	$16,946,733.00	$10,821,430.85	44.9%	$0.00	$7,737,494.81	$107,679,824.48	$234,670.08	

Key:	Withdrew prior to end of month

== March 2020 ==
Selected campaign-specific finance information through March 31, 2020, according to the FEC.

Democrats March 2020

Candidate	Money Raised	Individual Contributions	% Unitemized	Loans Received	Money Spent	Cash On Hand	Total Debt	Source
Michael Bloomberg	$125,922,834.78	$61,187.83 (Note: Candidate is not collecting donations, and thus has no individual contribution data.)	89.2%	$0.00	$175,374,861.39	$11,179,585.13	$14,789,537.40	
Bernie Sanders	$32,957,436.50	$32,784,637.45	48.4%	$0.00	$35,474,911.29	$16,176,081.96	$0.00	
Pete Buttigieg	$1,190,917.33	$628,116.24	45.8%	$0.00	$5,478,566.61	$6,011,814.46	$2,726,792.53	
Joe Biden	$46,741,036.92	$46,638,060.84	42.3%	$0.00	$32,452,621.95	$26,386,864.52	$0.00	
Elizabeth Warren	$5,963,127.40	$4,962,897.10	53.3%	$0.00	$12,556,256.67	$4,534,179.96	$1,295,995.55	
Amy Klobuchar	$738,538.21	$320,731.07	47.0%	$0.00	$3,719,579.70	$2,281,636.31	$0.00	
Tulsi Gabbard	$448,574.00	$425,742.37	43.4%	$0.00	$914,766.85	$640,209.55	$93,239.00	

Republicans March 2020

Candidate	Money Raised	Individual Contributions	% Unitemized	Loans Received	Money Spent	Cash On Hand	Total Debt	Source
Donald Trump	$13,635,667.55	$6,490,117.02	42.1%	$0.00	$9,592,371.11	$98,470,586.29	$234,670.08	
Bill Weld	$28,228.02	$27,329.02	41.0%	$0.00	$67,143.32	$15,173.01	$250,800.00	

Key:	Withdrew prior to end of month

== February 2020 ==
Selected campaign-specific finance information through February 29, 2020, according to the FEC.

Democrats February 2020

Candidate	Money Raised	Individual Contributions	% Unitemized	Loans Received	Money Spent	Cash On Hand	Total Debt	Source
Michael Bloomberg	$472,079,917.67	$0.00	N/A	$0.00	$466,586,616.35	$60,631,611.74	$31,661,136.33	
Bernie Sanders	$47,658,035.11	$47,590,464.12	51.3%	$0.00	$45,799,973.20	$18,693,556.75	$0.00	
Elizabeth Warren	$29,451,722.16	$29,405,330.86	52.3%	$0.00	$20,624,393.03	$11,127,309.23	$302,461.74	
Amy Klobuchar	$18,739,938.58	$18,714,180.47	48.0%	$0.00	$16,340,384.46	$5,262,677.80	$0.00	
Pete Buttigieg	$18,550,797.04	$18,381,024.73	41.7%	$0.00	$14,882,623.76	$10,299,463.74	$0.00	
Joe Biden	$18,102,510.80	$18,070,282.71	45.2%	$0.00	$13,110,560.33	$12,098,449.55	$0.00	
Tulsi Gabbard	$946,831.56	$892,085.31	40.6%	$0.00	$1,850,477.57	$1,106,402.40	$0.00	
Michael Bennet	$200,059.66	$197,646.36	47.3%	$0.00	$395,129.43	$217,077.67	$0.00	
Deval Patrick	$190,749.69	$190,377.17	15.6%	$0.00	$844,482.73	$388,088.84	$400,000.00	
Tom Steyer	$144,213.77	$144,213.77	49.2%	$0.00	$85,689,088.79	-$67,687,269.69	$24,000.00	

Republicans February 2020

Candidate	Money Raised	Individual Contributions	% Unitemized	Loans Received	Money Spent	Cash On Hand	Total Debt	Source
Donald Trump	$14,213,534.70	$8,594,896.19	45.8%	$0.00	$12,393,039.19	$94,427,289.85	$439,116.49	
Bill Weld	$155,285.86	$155,064.85	36.0%	$0.00	$119,387.98	$54,088.31	$250,800.00	
Joe Walsh	$2,635.03	$2,635.03	88.8%	$0.00	$5,041.76	$1,941.33	$332,225.24	

Key:	Withdrew prior to end of month

== January 2020 ==
Selected campaign-specific finance information through January 31, 2020, according to the FEC.

Democrats January 2020

Candidate	Money Raised	Individual Contributions	% Unitemized	Loans Received	Money Spent	Cash On Hand	Total Debt	Source
Michael Bloomberg	$263,785,505.44	$0.00	N/A	$0.00	$220,620,861.64	$55,138,310.42	$47,933,276.11	
Tom Steyer	$65,288,708.80	$638,402.18	49.4%	$0.00	$52,854,844.39	$17,857,605.33	$24,000.00	
Bernie Sanders	$25,174,337.90	$25,066,039.20	53.1%	$0.00	$26,534,551.08	$16,835,494.84	$0.00	
Elizabeth Warren	$11,030,669.06	$10,406,657.18	50.1%	$400,000.00	$22,445,998.02	$2,299,980.10	$400,000.00	
Joe Biden	$8,908,526.96	$8,881,609.90	35.4%	$0.00	$10,747,841.73	$7,106,499.08	$0.00	
Andrew Yang	$6,779,108.71	$6,773,361.98	40.6%	$0.00	$6,992,399.77	$3,506,936.13	$2,010.00	
Pete Buttigieg	$6,219,398.15	$6,159,200.57	29.2%	$0.00	$14,107,183.62	$6,631,290.46	$0.00	
Amy Klobuchar	$5,528,070.21	$5,519,377.99	44.2%	$0.00	$7,638,527.90	$2,863,123.68	$0.00	
Tulsi Gabbard	$1,086,363.32	$1,076,960.72	38.7%	$0.00	$1,834,201.71	$2,010,048.41	$604,694.88	
Cory Booker	$694,986.81	$692,997.86	50.8%	$0.00	$2,569,624.11	$2,364,480.88	$999,464.23	
Deval Patrick	$601,319.85	$601,319.85	6.5%	$0.00	$934,138.93	$1,041,821.88	$415,600.00	
John Delaney	$491,301.07	$19,669.55	22.0%	$0.00	$518,370.45	$112,811.86	$11,408,250.00	
Michael Bennet	$460,388.42	$460,388.42	41.6%	$0.00	$565,799.47	$412,147.44	$0.00	
Marianne Williamson	$164,958.88	$162,524.73	45.5%	$0.00	$179,822.89	$311,526.03	$258,797.48	
Julian Castro	$37,707.42	$34,399.74	61.0%	$0.00	$429,967.40	$561,653.62	$0.00	

Republicans January 2020

Candidate	Money Raised	Individual Contributions	% Unitemized	Loans Received	Money Spent	Cash On Hand	Total Debt	Source
Donald Trump	$6,408,982.13	$6,300,050.92	45.0%	$0.00	$16,587,891.98	$92,606,794.34	$309,116.49	
Bill Weld	$141,354.62	$114,070.69	23.5%	$15,000.00	$159,915.76	$18,190.43	$250,800.00	
Joe Walsh	$22,154.91	$7,154.91	77.6%	$15,000.00	$27,449.45	$4,348.06	$315,000.00	

Key:	Withdrew prior to end of month

== 4th Quarter 2019 ==
Selected campaign-specific finance information through December 31, 2019, according to the FEC.

Democrats 2019q4

Candidate	Money Raised	Individual Contributions	% Unitemized	Loans Received	Money Spent	Cash On Hand	Total Debt	Source
Michael Bloomberg	$200,359,618.56	$0.00	N/A	$0.00	$188,385,951.94	$11,973,666.62	$32,937,687.22	
Tom Steyer	$156,640,495.93	$868,418.99	73.2%	$0.00	$153,690,870.97	$5,423,740.92	$290,557.73	
Bernie Sanders	$34,560,198.37	$34,430,474.19	52.1%	$0.00	$50,098,742.09	$18,195,708.02	$0.00	
Pete Buttigieg	$25,199,606.22	$24,736,433.89	38.6%	$0.00	$34,062,538.39	$14,519,075.93	$0.00	
Joe Biden	$23,253,468.37	$23,201,033.91	38.5%	$0.00	$23,295,282.33	$8,945,813.85	$0.00	
Elizabeth Warren	$21,657,478.97	$21,299,859.17	53.2%	$0.00	$33,659,843.67	$13,715,309.06	$0.00	
Andrew Yang	$16,542,147.49	$16,518,824.30	40.5%	$0.00	$19,186,562.88	$3,720,227.19	$2,010.00	
Amy Klobuchar	$11,431,019.59	$11,413,221.52	45.2%	$0.00	$10,136,711.00	$4,973,581.37	$0.00	
Cory Booker	$6,583,720.54	$6,568,886.01	46.2%	$0.00	$6,568,391.28	$4,239,118.18	$978,062.86	
Kamala Harris	$3,943,842.50	$3,733,619.50	40.4%	$0.00	$13,067,123.21	$1,419,411.02	$1,073,364.92	
Tulsi Gabbard	$3,524,311.60	$3,485,325.86	55.2%	$0.00	$2,904,915.88	$2,757,886.80	$281,905.90	
Julian Castro	$2,638,781.53	$2,633,124.72	61.1%	$0.00	$2,357,201.42	$953,913.60	$0.00	
Deval Patrick	$2,277,907.07	$1,877,907.07	10.8%	$400,000.00	$871,301.02	$1,406,606.05	$400,000.00	
Marianne Williamson	$1,857,457.57	$1,856,282.25	41.3%	$0.00	$2,254,799.10	$326,390.04	$249,740.80	
Steve Bullock	$1,135,302.92	$1,130,007.52	29.6%	$0.00	$2,378,434.92	$122,761.62	$0.00	
Michael Bennet	$1,237,578.59	$1,232,734.85	30.6%	$0.00	$2,577,728.43	$517,558.49	$0.00	
John Delaney	$1,406,514.85	$134,831.50	22.1%	$815,000.00	$1,814,694.47	$139,881.24	$11,408,250.00	
Beto O'Rourke	$966,240.81	$964,966.10	36.8%	$0.00	$3,860,718.07	$361,252.61	$10,825.00	
Tim Ryan	$26,116.52	$23,934.58	38.9%	$0.00	$184,161.68	$303.76	$0.00	
Joe Sestak	$75,148.97	$73834.02	30.2%	$0.00	$276,133.49	$3,576.66	$0.00	
Wayne Messam	$0.00	$0.00	N/A	$0.00	$10,107.30	$12,538.06	$81,875.50	

Republicans 2019q4

Candidate	Money Raised	Individual Contributions	% Unitemized	Loans Received	Money Spent	Cash On Hand	Total Debt	Source
Donald Trump	$45,980,113.53	$20,260,945.79	44.5%	$0.00	$26,410,679.60	$102,785,704.19	$170,377.55	
Bill Weld	$410,762.52	$347,962.52	28.2%	$55,000.00	$582,054.74	$36,751.57	$235,800.00	
Joe Walsh	$245,123.67	$45,123.67	42.8%	$200,000.00	$350,910.77	$9,642.60	$300,000.00	
Mark Sanford	$39,270.74	$36,083.32	26.2%	$0.00	$103,421.79	$1,326,343.85	$0.00	

Key:	Withdrew prior to end of quarter

== 3rd Quarter 2019 ==
Selected campaign-specific finance information through September 30, 2019, according to the FEC.

Democrats 2019q3

Candidate	Money Raised	Individual Contributions	% Unitemized	Loans Received	Money Spent	Cash On Hand	Total Debt	Source
Tom Steyer	$49,645,131.61	$2,047,432.86	72.4%	$0.00	$47,021,989.49	$2,623,142.12	$0.00	
Bernie Sanders	$28,025,639.17	$25,247,440.91	59.5%	$0.00	$21,559,952.99	$33,734,251.74	$0.00	
Elizabeth Warren	$24,684,963.30	$24,610,428.73	60.8%	$0.00	$18,748,452.02	$25,717,673.76	$0.00	
Pete Buttigieg	$19,241,474.76	$19,173,600.41	45.2%	$0.00	$18,528,338.61	$23,382,008.10	$0.00	
Joe Biden	$15,741,464.43	$15,668,412.08	31.2%	$0.00	$17,650,903.58	$8,987,627.81	$72,181.52	
Kamala Harris	$11,849,290.45	$11,686,606.88	38.3%	$0.00	$14,578,958.89	$10,542,691.73	$911,069.23	
Andrew Yang	$9,922,625.52	$9,919,324.76	65.0%	$0.00	$4,412,923.43	$6,357,361.37	$0.00	
Cory Booker	$6,023,097.42	$6,002,041.53	38.4%	$0.00	$7,159,814.01	$4,223,788.92	$704,999.25	
Amy Klobuchar	$4,806,133.25	$4,804,672.15	48.5%	$0.00	$7,836,661.31	$3,679,592.17	$0.00	
Beto O'Rourke	$4,482,284.35	$4,468,423.24	43.2%	$0.00	$6,423,123.17	$3,255,729.87	$10,825.00	
Julian Castro	$3,497,251.00	$3,490,155.71	72.1%	$0.00	$3,960,970.81	$672,333.49	$0.00	
Marianne Williamson	$3,054,167.08	$3,052,666.90	60.1%	$0.00	$2,877,876.51	$723,731.57	$48,921.04	
Tulsi Gabbard	$3,032,158.63	$3,029,789.92	68.3%	$0.00	$2,138,491.08	$2,138,491.08	$0.00	
Steve Bullock	$2,299,449.06	$2,292,066.03	41.8%	$0.00	$2,423,527.43	$1,366,143.62	$0.00	
Michael Bennet	$2,109,205.72	$2,103,582.33	47.8%	$0.00	$2,444,742.40	$1,857,708.33	$0.00	
Jay Inslee	$1,614,471.23	$1,609,283.80	66.2%	$0.00	$2,508,684.33	$291,417.06	$0.00	
Kirsten Gillibrand	$1,020,093.87	$1,008,495.20	60.4%	$0.00	$7,705,701.30	$1,555,049.21	$0.00	
John Delaney	$868,452.26	$462,789.26	27.1%	$400,000.00	$7,763,004.07	$548,060.86	$10,593,250.00	
Tim Ryan	$425,731.01	$396,381.01	42.7%	$0.00	$602,440.41	$158,348.92	$28,225.21	
Joe Sestak	$374,195.61	$366,292.61	23.1%	$0.00	$169,634.43	$204,561.18	$0.00	
John Hickenlooper	$335,671.69	$221,875.04	44.5%	$75,000.00	$1,164,479.58	$7,468.27	$75,000.00	
Bill de Blasio	$330,045.73	$330,006.58	13.0%	$0.00	$1,015,192.19	$43,373.37	$0.00	
Seth Moulton	$306,774.30	$248,980.95	17.9%	$0.00	$971,718.67	$59,433.35	$0.00	
Mike Gravel	$120,798.51	$120,798.51	99.1%	$0.00	$134,568.64	-$13,770.13	$0.00	
Eric Swalwell	$16,311.84	$14,627.91	43.8%	$0.00	$535,902.37	$9150.15	$0.00	
Wayne Messam	$15,311.86	$15,311.86	58.6%	$0.00	$10,677.62	$22,645.36	$81,875.50	

Republicans 2019q3

Candidate	Money Raised	Individual Contributions	% Unitemized	Loans Received	Money Spent	Cash On Hand	Total Debt	Source
Donald Trump	$40,958,012.84	$14,248,442.05	46.9%	$0.00	$14,479,108.22	$83,216,270.26	$216,915.00	
Bill Weld	$457,428.75	$449,526.46	35.0%	$0.00	$548,609.98	$208,043.79	$180,800.00	
Joe Walsh	$234,991.50	$129,188.39	0.00004%	$100,000.00	$119,561.80	$115,429.70	$100,000.00	
Mark Sanford	$60,448.05	$58,204.10	33.6%	$0.00	$22,386.91	$1,392,405.28	$0.00	

Key:	Withdrew prior to end of quarter

== 2nd Quarter 2019 ==
Campaign-specific finance information through June 30, 2019, according to the FEC as of the quarterly filing deadline.

Democrats 2019q2

Candidate	Money Raised	Individual Contributions	% Unitemized	Loans Received	Money Spent	Cash On Hand	Total Debt	Source
Bernie Sanders	$25,659,945.61	$18,022,770.26	68.7%	$0.00	$14,053,330.41	$27,268,565.56	$0.00	
Pete Buttigieg	$24,927,335.17	$24,913,524.07	43.9%	$0.00	$8,824,013.95	$22,668,871.95	$0.00	
Joe Biden	$22,043,828.95	$21,966,174.26	37.9%	$0.00	$11,146,761.99	$10,897,066.96	$0.00	
Elizabeth Warren	$19,172,231.10	$19,161,452.94	66.5%	$0.00	$10,606,259.50	$19,781,162.48	$0.00	
Kamala Harris	$11,847,396.75	$11,795,233.07	45.2%	$0.00	$7,533,161.40	$13,272,360.17	$331,440.81	
John Delaney	$8,039,926.90	$284,475.15	25.0%	$7,750,000.00	$11,165,179.08	$7,442,612.67	$16,193,250.00	
Cory Booker	$4,548,183.10	$4,467,270.26	26.9%	$0.00	$5,318,688.02	$5,360,505.51	$292,759.54	
Amy Klobuchar	$3,877,931.86	$3,871,141.70	36.0%	$0.00	$4,149,259.80	$6,710,120.23	$0.00	
Beto O'Rourke	$3,647,729.32	$3,644,729.32	44.1%	$0.00	$5,313,366.40	$5,196,568.69	$41,341.20	
Michael Bennet	$3,506,968.46	$2,801,086.46	23.9%	$0.00	$1,313,723.45	$2,193,245.01	$0.00	
Jay Inslee	$3,051,590.47	$3,046,553.21	53.3%	$0.00	$3,278,841.05	$1,185,630.16	$171,991.30	
Andrew Yang	$2,832,968.97	$2,825,632.27	68.8%	$0.00	$3,129,787.83	$847,659.28	$0.00	
Julian Castro	$2,807,251.40	$2,800,185.12	74.3%	$0.00	$2,348,852.82	$1,136,053.30	$0.00	
Eric Swalwell	$2,586,127.60	$877,744.60	38.0%	$0.00	$2,057,386.92	$528,740.68	$10,398.32	
Kirsten Gillibrand	$2,297,587.01	$2,272,416.33	38.3%	$0.00	$4,225,432.55	$8,240,656.64	$0.00	
Steve Bullock	$2,072,970.87	$2,067,703.55	22.4%	$0.00	$582,748.88	$1,490,221.99	$0.00	
Seth Moulton	$1,940,003.25	$1,248,344.31	23.9%	$0.00	$1,215,625.53	$724,377.72	$98,018.99	
Tulsi Gabbard	$1,567,204.73	$1,564,652.59	69.0%	$0.00	$1,917,875.84	$2,438,554.85	$68,698.19	
Marianne Williamson	$1,522,036.67	$1,521,227.76	70.3%	$0.00	$1,525,954.28	$547,441.00	$302,366.33	
John Hickenlooper	$1,152,093.56	$1,119,484.85	23.5%	$0.00	$1,650,986.13	$836,276.16	$0.00	
Bill de Blasio	$1,087,564.24	$1,087,564.24	9.1%	$0.00	$359,044.41	$728,519.83	$71,195.64	
Tim Ryan	$889,398.86	$864,758.68	29.7%	$0.00	$554,340.54	$335,058.32	$0.00	
Mike Gravel	$209,260.76	$209,260.76	96.7%	$0.00	$94,611.63	$114,649.13	$0.00	
Wayne Messam	$68,074.39	$65,474.39	27.9%	$0.00	$91,893.65	$18,011.12	$81,875.50	

Republicans 2019q2

Candidate	Money Raised	Individual Contributions	% Unitemized	Loans Received	Money Spent	Cash On Hand	Total Debt	Source
Donald Trump	$26,516,845.63	$8,761,219.73	47.8%	$0.00	$10,541,672.69	$56,737,365.64	$294,070.29	
Bill Weld	$871,852.09	$691,052.09	35.5%	$180,800.00	$572,627.07	$299,225.02	$226,457.80	

Key:	Withdrew prior to end of quarter

== 1st Quarter 2019 ==
Campaign-specific finance information through March 30, 2019, according to the FEC as of the quarterly filing deadline.

Democrats 2019q1

Candidate	Money Raised	Individual Contributions	% Unitemized	Loans Received	Money Spent	Cash On Hand	Total Debt	Source
Bernie Sanders	$20,688,027.24	$18,186,300.21	84.0%	$0.00	$5,026,076.88	$15,661,950.36	$0.00	
Elizabeth Warren	$16,482,752.41	$6,016,435.38	70.3%	$0.00	$5,267,561.53	$11,215,190.88	$0.00	
Kamala Harris	$13,243,550.83	$12,024,121.55	36.8%	$0.00	$4,285,426.01	$8,958,124.82	$65,000.00	
Kirsten Gillibrand	$12,601,580.23	$2,997,879.10	16.7%	$0.00	$2,433,078.05	$10,168,502.18	$0.00	
John Delaney	$12,144,069.64	$404,301.17	18.0%	$11,700,000.00	$1,844,452.87	$10,567,864.85	$17,443,250.00	
Beto O'Rourke	$9,373,261.40	$9,369,861.40	59.1%	$0.00	$2,511,055.63	$6,862,205.77	$0.00	
Amy Klobuchar	$8,832,322.42	$5,232,375.87	34.6%	$0.00	$1,850,874.25	$6,981,448.17	$0.00	
Cory Booker	$7,923,204.28	$5,044,390.15	16.0%	$0.00	$1,792,193.85	$6,131,010.43	$51,989.35	
Pete Buttigieg	$7,410,218.57	$7,405,148.80	65.2%	$0.00	$844,667.84	$6,565,550.73	$0.00	
Tulsi Gabbard	$4,495,769.56	$1,949,074.92	54.8%	$0.00	$1,706,543.60	$2,789,225.96	$0.00	
Jay Inslee	$2,256,655.41	$2,255,455.41	34.0%	$0.00	$843,774.67	$1,412,880.74	$365,194.64	
John Hickenlooper	$2,020,682.57	$2,011,299.37	10.0%	$0.00	$685,513.84	$1,335,168.73	$0.00	
Andrew Yang	$1,781,936.19	$1,776,875.12	79.8%	$0.00	$676,188.83	$1,144,478.14	$0.00	
Marianne Williamson	$1,548,821.25	$1,546,543.58	60.1%	$0.00	$997,462.64	$551,358.61	$166,538.41	
Julian Castro	$1,100,641.02	$1,092,941.02	34.1%	$0.00	$625,496.80	$677,654.72	$19,284.83	
Wayne Messam	$43,531.62	$43,531.62	26.6%	$0.00	$1,701.24	$41,830.38	$0.00	
Richard Ojeda	$20,347.63	$20,346.16	89.4%	$0.00	$30,718.60	$2,001.98	$44,372.93	

Republicans 2019q1

Candidate	Money Raised	Individual Contributions	% Unitemized	Loans Received	Money Spent	Cash On Hand	Total Debt	Source
Donald Trump	$30,304,180.03	$7,325,369.32	54.3%	$0.00	$8,834,888.53	$40,762,192.70	$528,116.26	

Key:	Withdrew prior to end of quarter

== See also ==
- Invisible/Money primary
- 2020 Democratic Party presidential primaries
- Campaign finance in the United States
