= Fundraising in the 2024 United States presidential election =

Fundraising plays a central role in many presidential campaigns, and is a key factor in determining the viability of candidates. Money raised is applied for the salaries of non-volunteers in the campaign, transportation, campaign materials, media advertisements and other contingencies. Under United States law, officially declared candidates are required to file campaign finance details with the Federal Election Commission (FEC) at the end of every calendar month or quarter. Summaries of these reports are made available to the public shortly thereafter, revealing the relative financial situations of all the campaigns.

== 2024 ==
=== Post-General ===
Selected campaign-specific finance information through November 25, 2024, according to the FEC.

Overview of campaign financing for presidential candidates in November 2024
Candidate	Total raised	Total raised since last quarter	Individual contributions			Debt	Spent	Spent since last quarter	Cash on hand
Candidate	Total raised	Total raised since last quarter	Total	Unitemized	Pct	Debt	Spent	Spent since last quarter	Cash on hand
Harris	$1,185,477,494	$160,055,220	$613,565,543	$211,831,007	34.5%	$0	$1,216,091,696	$277,057,928	$1,822,802
Trump	$477,103,847	$86,774,358	$68,592,759	$24,540,580	35.8%	$11,362,696	$462,407,174	$113,116,344	$9,872,696
Kennedy	$64,705,819	$3,056,411	$64,058,651	$17,158,007	26.8%	$2,924,501	$63,813,858	$3,113,700	$1,160,734
West	$1,374,286	$35,914	$1,371,172	$695,772	50.7%	$72,605	$1,361,781	$37,911	$4,843

=== Pre-General ===
Selected campaign-specific finance information through October 16, 2024, according to the FEC.

Overview of campaign financing for presidential candidates in October 2024
Candidate	Total raised	Total raised since last quarter	Individual contributions			Debt	Spent	Spent since last quarter	Cash on hand
Candidate	Total raised	Total raised since last quarter	Total	Unitemized	Pct	Debt	Spent	Spent since last quarter	Cash on hand
Harris	$1,025,424,011	$97,211,775	$504,671,459	$181,167,800	35.9%	$0	$939,033,505	$165,857,413	$118,825,510
Trump	$391,920,530	$16,227,642	$54,524,760	$16,304,223	29.9%	$10,446	$355,705,848	$99,689,404	$36,214,682
Kennedy	$62,846,924	$565,836	$62,298,081	$16,005,549	25.7%	$4,525,133	$61,628,901	$240,464	$1,218,024
West	$1,345,338	$18,652	$1,345,075	$678,620	50.5%	$72,605	$1,338,498	$25,483	$6,840

=== September ===
Selected campaign-specific finance information through September 30, 2024, according to the FEC.

Overview of campaign financing for presidential candidates in September 2024
Candidate	Total raised	Total raised since last quarter	Individual contributions			Debt	Spent	Spent since last quarter	Cash on hand
Candidate	Total raised	Total raised since last quarter	Total	Unitemized	Pct	Debt	Spent	Spent since last quarter	Cash on hand
Harris	$928,210,236	$221,800,946	$437,468,126	$162,848,775	37.2%	$0	$773,176,093	$269,813,057	$187,471,148
Trump	$375,692,888	$62,679,927	$43,065,329	$16,304,223	37.9%	$130,999	$256,016,444	$77,579,173	$119,676,444
Kennedy	$62,281,089	$1,909,447	$61,781,211	$15,751,678	25.5%	$4,525,133	$61,388,437	$3,216,273	$892,652
West	$1,323,531	$34,986	$1,323,308	$664,473	50.2%	$77,860	$1,277,444	$0	$46,086

=== August ===
Selected campaign-specific finance information through August 31, 2024, according to the FEC.

Overview of campaign financing for presidential candidates in August 2024
Candidate	Total raised	Total raised since last quarter	Individual contributions			Debt	Spent	Spent since last quarter	Cash on hand
Candidate	Total raised	Total raised since last quarter	Total	Unitemized	Pct	Debt	Spent	Spent since last quarter	Cash on hand
Harris	$706,409,291	$189,615,034	$335,939,207	$133,333,001	39.7%	$0	$503,363,036	$173,848,978	$235,483,260
Trump	$313,012,961	$44,500,313	$28,439,833	$11,303,219	39.7%	$481,063	$178,437,271	$61,264,937	$134,575,691
Kennedy	$60,371,641	$2,738,360	$60,149,329	$15,164,249	25.2%	$4,020,685	$58,172,164	$4,454,850	$2,199,478
West	$1,288,545	$30,763	$1,288,322	$648,872	50.4%	$77,860	$1,277,444	$31,783	$11,101

=== July ===
Selected campaign-specific finance information through July 31, 2024, according to the FEC.

Overview of campaign financing for presidential candidates in July 2024
Candidate	Total raised	Total raised since last quarter	Individual contributions			Debt	Spent	Spent since last quarter	Cash on hand
Candidate	Total raised	Total raised since last quarter	Total	Unitemized	Pct	Debt	Spent	Spent since last quarter	Cash on hand
Harris	$516,794,257	$204,488,911	$236,647,429	$100,228,765	42.4%	$0	$329,514,057	$80,718,190	$219,717,204
Trump	$268,512,649	$47,511,053	$18,171,011	$7,421,664	40.8%	$15,233	$117,172,334	$24,267,608	$151,340,315
Kennedy	$57,633,281	$5,623,152	$57,542,505	$14,428,306	25.1%	$3,487,266	$53,717,314	$7,283,007	$3,915,968
West	$1,257,782	$36,998	$1,257,559	$634,067	50.4%	$6,798	$1,245,661	$49,397	$12,121

=== June ===
Selected campaign-specific finance information through June 30, 2024, according to the FEC.

==== Democrats ====
Overview of campaign financing for Democratic presidential candidates in June 2024
Candidate	Total raised	Total raised since last quarter	Individual contributions			Debt	Spent	Spent since last quarter	Cash on hand
Candidate	Total raised	Total raised since last quarter	Total	Unitemized	Pct	Debt	Spent	Spent since last quarter	Cash on hand
Biden	$312,305,346	$63,791,037	$117,355,916	$52,257,694	44.5%	$0	$248,795,867	$59,410,669	$95,946,483
Williamson	$5,203,962	$14,217	$4,062,374	$1,910,155	47.0%	$1,129,543	$5,038,928	$12,295	$165,034

Candidate who suspended campaign during the filing period

==== Republicans ====
Overview of campaign financing for Republican presidential candidates in June 2024
Candidate	Total raised	Total raised since last quarter	Individual contributions			Debt	Spent	Spent since last quarter	Cash on hand
Candidate	Total raised	Total raised since last quarter	Total	Unitemized	Pct	Debt	Spent	Spent since last quarter	Cash on hand
Trump	$221,001,595	$21,456,920	$9,837,843	$4,019,758	40.9%	$288,189	$92,904,725	$9,925,125	$128,096,870

==== Independents ====
Overview of campaign financing for independent presidential candidates in June 2024
Candidate	Total raised	Total raised since last quarter	Individual contributions			Debt	Spent	Spent since last quarter	Cash on hand
Candidate	Total raised	Total raised since last quarter	Total	Unitemized	Pct	Debt	Spent	Spent since last quarter	Cash on hand
Kennedy	$52,010,129	$5,389,346	$51,923,383	$13,231,782	25.5%	$3,071,865	$46,434,307	$6,252,498	$5,575,823
West	$1,220,784	$63,582	$1,220,561	$615,858	50.5%	$16,958	$1,196,264	$54,443	$24,520

=== May ===
Selected campaign-specific finance information through May 31, 2024, according to the FEC.

==== Democrats ====
Overview of campaign financing for Democratic presidential candidates in May 2024
Candidate	Total raised	Total raised since last quarter	Individual contributions			Debt	Spent	Spent since last quarter	Cash on hand
Candidate	Total raised	Total raised since last quarter	Total	Unitemized	Pct	Debt	Spent	Spent since last quarter	Cash on hand
Biden	$248,514,310	$37,663,158	$89,247,794	$41,160,328	46.1%	$0	$189,385,198	$30,582,471	$91,566,116
Williamson	$5,189,745	$53,616	$4,048,645	$1,904,729	47.0%	$1,129,543	$5,026,633	$45,573	$163,112
Palmer	$931,687	$78,790	$50,608	$7,308	14.4%	$686,710	$927,150	$80,100	$4,537

Candidate who suspended campaign during the filing period

==== Republicans ====
Overview of campaign financing for Republican presidential candidates in May 2024
Candidate	Total raised	Total raised since last quarter	Individual contributions			Debt	Spent	Spent since last quarter	Cash on hand
Candidate	Total raised	Total raised since last quarter	Total	Unitemized	Pct	Debt	Spent	Spent since last quarter	Cash on hand
Trump	$199,544,675	$75,393,463	$2,328,862	$931,984	40.0%	$140,946	$82,979,601	$7,892,437	$116,565,075

==== Independents ====
Overview of campaign financing for independent presidential candidates in May 2024
Candidate	Total raised	Total raised since last quarter	Individual contributions			Debt	Spent	Spent since last quarter	Cash on hand
Candidate	Total raised	Total raised since last quarter	Total	Unitemized	Pct	Debt	Spent	Spent since last quarter	Cash on hand
Kennedy	$46,620,784	$2,591,427	$46,539,909	$12,270,295	26.4%	$2,652,341	$40,181,809	$6,338,905	$6,438,975
West	$1,157,202	$61,073	$1,157,074	$582,091	50.3%	$28,580	$1,141,821	$64,385	$15,381

=== April ===
Selected campaign-specific finance information through April 30, 2024, according to the FEC.

==== Democrats ====
Overview of campaign financing for Democratic presidential candidates in April 2024
Candidate	Total raised	Total raised since last quarter	Individual contributions			Debt	Spent	Spent since last quarter	Cash on hand
Candidate	Total raised	Total raised since last quarter	Total	Unitemized	Pct	Debt	Spent	Spent since last quarter	Cash on hand
Biden (Note: Biden's principal campaign committee, Biden for President, was also used for his earlier 2020 presidential campaign. Some of these figures, therefore, include money left over from that previous candidacy.)	$210,851,152	$24,152,086	$71,717,267	$34,119,820	47.6%	$0	$158,802,727	$25,213,215	$84,485,429
Williamson	$5,136,128	$42,658	$4,026,627	$1,898,382	47.1%	$1,085,218	$4,981,060	$65,582	$155,069
Palmer	$852,897	$52,497	$49,833	$7,283	14.6%	$686,710	$847,049	$48,264	$5,848

==== Republicans ====
Overview of campaign financing for Republican presidential candidates in April 2024
Candidate	Total raised	Total raised since last quarter	Individual contributions			Debt	Spent	Spent since last quarter	Cash on hand
Candidate	Total raised	Total raised since last quarter	Total	Unitemized	Pct	Debt	Spent	Spent since last quarter	Cash on hand
Trump	$124,151,213	$9,432,589	$1,356,368	$531,701	39.2%	$1,084,890	$75,087,164	$5,508,669	$49,064,049

==== Independents ====
Overview of campaign financing for independent presidential candidates in April 2024
Candidate	Total raised	Total raised since last quarter	Individual contributions			Debt	Spent	Spent since last quarter	Cash on hand
Candidate	Total raised	Total raised since last quarter	Total	Unitemized	Pct	Debt	Spent	Spent since last quarter	Cash on hand
Kennedy	$44,029,356	$10,671,289	$43,971,503	$11,403,378	25.9%	$1,196,508	$33,842,903	$6,520,942	$10,186,453
West	$1,096,129	$70,702	$1,096,001	$546,592	49.9%	$28,580	$1,077,436	$100,297	$18,693

=== March ===
Selected campaign-specific finance information through March 31, 2024, according to the FEC.

==== Democrats ====
Overview of campaign financing for Democratic presidential candidates in March 2024
Candidate	Total raised	Total raised since last quarter	Individual contributions			Debt	Spent	Spent since last quarter	Cash on hand
Candidate	Total raised	Total raised since last quarter	Total	Unitemized	Pct	Debt	Spent	Spent since last quarter	Cash on hand
Biden	$186,699,066	$43,779,068	$61,298,644	$30,058,265	49.0%	$0	$133,589,512	$29,244,430	$85,546,559
Phillips	$6,931,364	$364,628	$14,628	$8,828	60.4%	$350,000	$7,372,025	$439,486	$1,308
Williamson	$5,093,470	$99,306	$3,988,045	$1,882,990	47.2%	$1,085,219	$4,915,477	$123,514	$177,993
Palmer	$800,400	$74,960	$43,848	$6,498	14.8%	$686,710	$798,785	$112,018	$1,615

Candidate who suspended campaign during the filing period

==== Republicans ====
Overview of campaign financing for Republican presidential candidates in March 2024
Candidate	Total raised	Total raised since last quarter	Individual contributions			Debt	Spent	Spent since last quarter	Cash on hand
Candidate	Total raised	Total raised since last quarter	Total	Unitemized	Pct	Debt	Spent	Spent since last quarter	Cash on hand
Trump	$114,718,624	$15,341,624	$1,180,783	$488,974	41.4%	$569,899	$69,578,495	$3,739,984	$45,140,129
Haley	$57,217,202	$1,035,818	$46,910,524	$12,767,286	27.2%	$0	$49,379,861	$4,702,296	$7,837,340

Candidate who suspended campaign during the filing period

==== Independents ====
Overview of campaign financing for independent presidential candidates in March 2024
Candidate	Total raised	Total raised since last quarter	Individual contributions			Debt	Spent	Spent since last quarter	Cash on hand
Candidate	Total raised	Total raised since last quarter	Total	Unitemized	Pct	Debt	Spent	Spent since last quarter	Cash on hand
Kennedy	$33,358,068	$5,396,578	$33,313,076	$10,567,042	31.7%	$1,584,716	$27,321,962	$4,493,923	$6,036,106
West	$1,025,428	$92,069	$1,025,299	$508,130	49.6%	$62,416	$977,139	$69,829	$48,288

=== February ===
Selected campaign-specific finance information through February 29, 2024, according to the FEC.

==== Democrats ====
Overview of campaign financing for Democratic presidential candidates in February 2024
Candidate	Total raised	Total raised since last quarter	Individual contributions			Debt	Spent	Spent since last quarter	Cash on hand
Candidate	Total raised	Total raised since last quarter	Total	Unitemized	Pct	Debt	Spent	Spent since last quarter	Cash on hand
Biden	$142,919,999	$21,326,368	$42,125,521	$21,432,870	50.9%	$0	$104,345,082	$6,297,582	$71,011,921
Phillips	$7,020,232	$453,496	$1,770,212	$417,833	23.6%	$5,486,430	$6,932,539	$577,294	$76,166
Williamson (Note: Williamson's campaign was suspended on February 7, although she rejoined the race on February 28.)	$4,994,164	$138,646	$3,890,143	$1,838,176	47.3%	$1,085,218	$4,791,963	$417,411	$202,201
Palmer	$725,440	$151,590	$37,280	$4,280	11.5%	$686,710	$682,862	$177,510	$42,578

==== Republicans ====
Overview of campaign financing for Republican presidential candidates in February 2024
Candidate	Total raised	Total raised since last quarter	Individual contributions			Debt	Spent	Spent since last quarter	Cash on hand
Candidate	Total raised	Total raised since last quarter	Total	Unitemized	Pct	Debt	Spent	Spent since last quarter	Cash on hand
Trump	$99,377,000	$10,898,012	$843,020	$353,388	41.9%	$274,920	$65,838,511	$7,848,263	$33,538,489
Haley	$56,181,384	$8,605,993	$45,875,316	$12,404,235	27.0%	$0	$44,677,565	$10,100,212	$11,503,819
Binkley	$11,435,394	$332,252	$370,240	$2,435	0.7%	$10,698,206	$11,417,756	$347,691	$17,638

Candidate who suspended campaign during the filing period

==== Independents ====
Overview of campaign financing for independent presidential candidates in February 2024
Candidate	Total raised	Total raised since last quarter	Individual contributions			Debt	Spent	Spent since last quarter	Cash on hand
Candidate	Total raised	Total raised since last quarter	Total	Unitemized	Pct	Debt	Spent	Spent since last quarter	Cash on hand
Kennedy	$27,961,490	$3,173,716	$27,920,192	$9,202,766	33.0%	$1,375,228	$22,828,039	$2,893,218	$5,133,451
West	$933,359	$153,832	$933,359	$465,699	49.9%	$12,939	$907,310	$230,657	$26,048

=== January ===
Selected campaign-specific finance information through January 31, 2024, according to the FEC.

==== Democrats ====
Overview of campaign financing for Democratic presidential candidates in January 2024
Candidate	Total raised	Total raised since last quarter	Individual contributions			Debt	Spent	Spent since last quarter	Cash on hand
Candidate	Total raised	Total raised since last quarter	Total	Unitemized	Pct	Debt	Spent	Spent since last quarter	Cash on hand
Biden	$121,593,630	$15,718,139	$34,342,205	$18,045,062	52.5%	$0	$98,047,501	$5,693,303	$55,983,134
Phillips	$6,566,736	$1,550,497	$1,566,716	$377,934	24.1%	$5,236,430	$6,361,559	$1,710,534	$199,964
Williamson	$4,855,518	$1,001,143	$3,753,960	$1,778,669	47.4%	$1,190,064	$4,374,552	$729,069	$480,966
Palmer	$573,850	$279,225	$37,140	$4,140	11.1%	$536,710	$505,352	$341,951	$68,498

==== Republicans ====
Overview of campaign financing for Republican presidential candidates in January 2024
Candidate	Total raised	Total raised since last quarter	Individual contributions			Debt	Spent	Spent since last quarter	Cash on hand
Candidate	Total raised	Total raised since last quarter	Total	Unitemized	Pct	Debt	Spent	Spent since last quarter	Cash on hand
Trump	$88,478,988	$8,844,631	$657,459	$276,897	42.1%	$1,074,321	$57,990,248	$11,443,833	$30,488,740
Haley	$47,575,391	$11,549,207	$38,590,012	$10,149,916	26.3%	$0	$34,577,353	$13,108,050	$12,998,038
Ramaswamy	$41,390,957	$4,335,212	$11,845,047	$5,317,997	44.9%	$27,670,000	$39,548,795	$3,982,498	$1,842,162
DeSantis	$39,134,023	$1,147,602	$32,921,293	$6,877,293	20.9%	$25,486	$30,355,489	$2,105,419	$8,778,534
Binkley	$11,103,142	$864,711	$362,591	$1,756	0.5%	$10,428,828	$11,070,065	$869,488	$33,078
Christie	$7,455,795	$124,891	$7,421,555	$2,191,418	29.5%	$0	$6,413,960	$1,392,607	$1,041,835
Hutchinson	$1,561,012	$50,294	$1,338,613	$505,225	37.7%	$64,271	$1,511,853	$81,651	$49,159

Candidate who suspended campaign during the filing period

==== Independents ====
Overview of campaign financing for independent presidential candidates in January 2024
Candidate	Total raised	Total raised since last quarter	Individual contributions			Debt	Spent	Spent since last quarter	Cash on hand
Candidate	Total raised	Total raised since last quarter	Total	Unitemized	Pct	Debt	Spent	Spent since last quarter	Cash on hand
Kennedy	$24,787,774	$2,672,092	$24,749,668	$7,952,219	32.1%	$0	$19,934,821	$3,257,921	$4,852,953
West	$779,527	$140,898	$779,527	$431,159	55.3%	$14,553	$676,653	$124,706	$102,873

== 2023 ==
=== October to December ===
Selected campaign-specific finance information from October 1 to December 31, 2023, according to the FEC.

==== Democrats ====
Overview of campaign financing for Democratic presidential candidates in Q4 2023
Candidate	Total raised	Total raised since last quarter	Individual contributions			Debt	Spent	Spent since last quarter	Cash on hand
Candidate	Total raised	Total raised since last quarter	Total	Unitemized	Pct	Debt	Spent	Spent since last quarter	Cash on hand
Biden	$105,875,491	$33,037,210	$25,975,051	$14,305,517	55.1%	$0	$92,354,198	$19,259,279	$45,958,298
Phillips	$5,016,238	$5,016,238	$1,016,218	$225,927	22.2%	$4,236,430	$4,656,238	$4,656,238	$360,000
Williamson	$3,854,375	$1,339,016	$3,355,377	$1,616,210	48.2%	$593,031	$3,645,484	$1,231,291	$208,892
Palmer	$294,625	$294,625	$29,625	$3,015	10.2%	$265,000	$163,401	$163,401	$131,224

==== Republicans ====
Overview of campaign financing for Republican presidential candidates in Q4 2023
Candidate	Total raised	Total raised since last quarter	Individual contributions			Debt	Spent	Spent since last quarter	Cash on hand
Candidate	Total raised	Total raised since last quarter	Total	Unitemized	Pct	Debt	Spent	Spent since last quarter	Cash on hand
Trump	$79,634,357	$19,111,279	$431,699	$178,977	41.5%	$99,329	$46,546,415	$23,565,298	$33,087,942
DeSantis	$38,361,550	$6,714,088	$32,490,189	$6,781,494	20.9%	$26,167	$28,625,199	$9,304,642	$9,736,351
Ramaswamy	$37,055,746	$10,446,566	$11,450,460	$5,126,038	44.8%	$23,750,000	$35,566,297	$12,204,994	$1,489,448
Haley	$36,026,184	$17,316,948	$28,792,841	$6,795,202	23.6%	$0	$21,469,303	$14,311,759	$14,556,882
Burgum	$17,882,365	$2,702,700	$3,087,845	$689,129	22.3%	$13,970,653	$17,805,576	$4,948,486	$76,789
Johnson	$14,570,449	$972	$148,692	$0	0.0%	$0	$13,632,192	$227,917	–$11,533,150
Scott	$14,492,592	$1,444,044	$12,224,139	$4,241,714	34.7%	$0	$30,309,565	$8,396,863	$6,337,306
Binkley	$10,239,657	$3,153,286	$359,728	$21,578	6.0%	$9,717,165	$10,200,577	$3,125,643	$39,080
Christie	$7,330,905	$1,891,871	$7,296,867	$2,138,024	29.3%	$0	$5,021,353	$3,497,539	$2,309,552
Pence	$5,109,979	$584,250	$5,023,544	$2,097,236	41.7%	$1,498,131	$4,408,468	$1,064,191	$701,511
Hutchinson	$1,510,718	$261,415	$1,295,319	$798,923	61.7%	$57,271	$1,430,201	$506,186	$80,516
Hurd	$1,451,431	–$1,107	$1,447,586	$735,367	50.8%	$15,479	$1,424,502	$195,038	$26,929
Elder	$1,375,322	–$62,823	$1,346,145	$918,078	68.2%	$149,396	$1,372,426	$178,982	$2,696

Candidate who suspended campaign during the filing period

==== Independents ====
Overview of campaign financing for independent presidential candidates in Q4 2023
Candidate	Total raised	Total raised since last quarter	Individual contributions			Debt	Spent	Spent since last quarter	Cash on hand
Candidate	Total raised	Total raised since last quarter	Total	Unitemized	Pct	Debt	Spent	Spent since last quarter	Cash on hand
Kennedy	$22,115,682	$7,037,153	$22,080,359	$7,034,122	31.9%	$0	$16,676,899	$7,770,412	$5,438,782
West	$638,629	$316,821	$638,629	$380,849	59.6%	$0	$551,947	$335,546	$86,682

=== July to September ===
Selected campaign-specific finance information from July 1 to September 30, 2023, according to the FEC.

==== Democrats ====
Overview of campaign financing for Democratic presidential candidates in Q3 2023
Candidate	Total raised	Total raised since last quarter	Individual contributions			Debt	Spent	Spent since last quarter	Cash on hand
Candidate	Total raised	Total raised since last quarter	Total	Unitemized	Pct	Debt	Spent	Spent since last quarter	Cash on hand
Biden	$72,838,281	$24,785,201	$15,237,941	$9,061,416	59.5%	$0	$73,094,919	$12,730,208	$32,180,366
Kennedy	$15,078,528	$8,713,134	$15,052,084	$5,072,721	33.7%	$0	$8,906,488	$7,060,571	$6,172,041
Williamson	$2,515,359	$821,832	$2,277,201	$1,191,053	52.3%	$347,490	$2,414,193	$825,656	$101,167

==== Republicans ====
Overview of campaign financing for Republican presidential candidates in Q3 2023
Candidate	Total raised	Total raised since last quarter	Individual contributions			Debt	Spent	Spent since last quarter	Cash on hand
Candidate	Total raised	Total raised since last quarter	Total	Unitemized	Pct	Debt	Spent	Spent since last quarter	Cash on hand
Trump	$60,523,078	$24,535,602	$198,507	$48,495	24.4%	$295,222	$22,981,118	$9,510,032	$37,541,961
DeSantis	$31,272,333	$11,160,604	$28,630,211	$5,393,747	18.8%	$1,089,428	$18,945,428	$11,073,127	$12,326,905
Ramaswamy	$26,609,180	$7,444,499	$9,560,937	$4,466,614	46.7%	$15,250,000	$22,361,303	$12,227,262	$4,247,877
Haley	$18,709,236	$8,240,333	$14,115,020	$3,413,529	24.2%	$0	$7,157,544	$3,502,174	$11,551,692
Burgum	$15,179,666	$3,411,365	$2,935,366	$593,430	20.2%	$12,200,653	$12,857,090	$4,742,728	$2,322,576
Johnson	$14,569,477	$5,762,284	$147,720	$0	0.0%	$12,503,240	$13,441,587	$7,174,976	$1,127,750
Scott	$13,048,548	$4,597,516	$11,085,680	$3,676,601	33.2%	$927,827	$21,912,702	$12,374,262	$13,440,124
Binkley	$7,086,371	$4,990,944	$331,327	$107,841	32.6%	$6,664,175	$7,074,934	$5,590,586	$11,437
Christie	$5,439,033	$3,782,647	$5,405,108	$1,515,736	28.0%	$0	$1,523,814	$1,457,602	$3,915,219
Pence	$4,525,729	$3,356,996	$4,345,294	$1,830,940	42.1%	$621,445	$3,344,277	$3,269,934	$1,181,452
Hurd	$1,452,538	$1,179,025	$1,449,065	$731,948	50.5%	$0	$1,229,464	$1,201,069	$223,074
Elder	$1,437,945	$970,414	$1,412,068	$903,288	64.0%	$0	$1,193,444	$1,050,530	$244,501
Suarez	$1,425,517	$480,067	$1,425,417	$125,798	8.8%	$19,091	$1,365,124	$1,318,524	$60,393
Hutchinson	$1,249,302	$666,781	$1,127,734	$466,918	41.4%	$0	$924,015	$720,172	$325,287

Candidate who suspended campaign during the filing period

=== April to June ===
Selected campaign-specific finance information from April 1 to June 30, 2023, according to the FEC.

==== Democrats ====
Overview of campaign financing for Democratic presidential candidates in Q2 2023
Candidate	Total raised	Total raised since last quarter	Individual contributions			Debt	Spent	Spent since last quarter	Cash on hand
Candidate	Total raised	Total raised since last quarter	Total	Unitemized	Pct	Debt	Spent	Spent since last quarter	Cash on hand
Biden	$48,053,081	$19,867,069	$8,644,232	$5,365,699	62.1%	$0	$60,364,711	$1,106,112	$20,125,374
Kennedy	$6,365,394	$6,365,394	$6,352,194	$2,301,595	36.2%	$0	$1,845,917	$1,845,917	$4,519,477
Williamson	$1,693,528	$920,636	$1,463,436	$784,070	53.6%	$270,736	$1,588,537	$1,055,793	$104,991

==== Republicans ====
Overview of campaign financing for Republican presidential candidates in Q2 2023
Candidate	Total raised	Total raised since last quarter	Individual contributions			Debt	Spent	Spent since last quarter	Cash on hand
Candidate	Total raised	Total raised since last quarter	Total	Unitemized	Pct	Debt	Spent	Spent since last quarter	Cash on hand
Trump	$35,987,476	$17,714,573	$90,906	$24,093	26.5%	$48,453	$13,471,085	$9,130,130	$22,516,391
DeSantis	$20,111,729	$20,111,729	$19,726,903	$2,867,815	14.5%	$11,358	$7,872,301	$7,872,301	$12,239,428
Ramaswamy	$19,164,680	$7,746,232	$3,156,462	$1,645,444	52.1%	$15,250,000	$10,134,041	$8,082,881	$9,030,639
Burgum	$11,768,301	$11,768,301	$1,581,348	$184,152	11.6%	$10,377,842	$8,114,362	$8,114,362	$3,653,939
Haley	$10,468,903	$5,343,472	$7,610,990	$1,668,571	21.9%	$0	$3,655,370	$2,599,489	$6,813,533
Johnson	$8,810,680	$5,047,285	$67,023	$0	0.0%	$8,415,658	$6,270,239	$4,543,319	$2,540,441
Scott	$8,451,031	$5,856,927	$7,345,862	$2,396,987	32.6%	$23,310	$9,538,440	$6,740,642	$21,106,870
Binkley	$2,095,427	$2,095,427	$192,775	$42,067	21.8%	$1,904,347	$1,484,348	$1,484,348	$611,079
Christie	$1,656,386	$1,656,386	$1,647,980	$570,905	34.6%	$0	$66,213	$66,213	$1,590,173
Pence	$1,168,733	$1,168,733	$1,160,433	$346,885	29.9%	$0	$74,343	$74,343	$1,094,390
Suarez	$945,451	$945,451	$945,451	$28,788	3.0%	$106,513	$46,600	$46,600	$898,850
Hutchinson	$582,521	$582,521	$497,200	$80,375	16.2%	$0	$203,844	$203,844	$378,678
Elder	$467,531	$467,531	$453,331	$138,304	30.5%	$0	$142,914	$142,914	$324,617
Hurd	$273,513	$273,513	$270,075	$54,155	20.1%	$0	$28,394	$28,394	$245,118

=== January to March ===
Selected campaign-specific finance information from January 1 to March 31, 2023, according to the FEC.

==== Democrats ====
Overview of campaign financing for Democratic presidential candidates in Q1 2023
Candidate	Total raised	Total raised since last quarter	Individual contributions			Debt	Spent	Spent since last quarter	Cash on hand
Candidate	Total raised	Total raised since last quarter	Total	Unitemized	Pct	Debt	Spent	Spent since last quarter	Cash on hand
Biden (Note: Not a candidate during this period.)	$28,186,012	$360	$8,207	$5,400	65.8%	$0	$59,258,599	$423,441	$1,364,417
Williamson	$772,892	$772,892	$664,679	$309,430	46.6%	$106,000	$532,744	$532,744	$240,148

==== Republicans ====
Overview of campaign financing for Republican presidential candidates in Q1 2023
Candidate	Total raised	Total raised since last quarter	Individual contributions			Debt	Spent	Spent since last quarter	Cash on hand
Candidate	Total raised	Total raised since last quarter	Total	Unitemized	Pct	Debt	Spent	Spent since last quarter	Cash on hand
Trump	$18,272,903	$14,449,602	$16,361	$4,911	30.0%	$255,110	$4,340,955	$3,538,556	$13,931,948
Ramaswamy	$11,418,449	$11,418,449	$851,637	$415,555	48.8%	$10,250,000	$2,051,160	$2,051,160	$9,367,288
Haley	$5,125,431	$5,125,431	$3,283,822	$798,184	24.3%	$0	$1,055,881	$1,055,881	$4,069,549
Johnson	$3,763,396	$3,763,396	$5,838	$0	0.0%	$3,429,558	$1,726,920	$1,726,920	$2,036,476

== See also ==
- Invisible primary
