= Hat in the Ring =

Hat in the Ring may refer to:

- "Throw one's hat in the ring", a challenger in boxing or campaign announcement in politics
- "Hat in the Ring", the motto of the 94th Fighter Squadron of the United States Air Force
