= Michele Bachmann 2012 presidential campaign =

American political campaign

Michele Bachmann for President 2012
- Campaign: 2012 U.S. presidential election
- Candidate: Michele Bachmann; U.S. Representative from Minnesota (2007–2015)
- Affiliation: Republican Party
- Status: Announced: June 13, 2011; Suspended: January 4, 2012
- Headquarters: Woodbury, Minnesota
- Key people: Keith Nahigian (manager); Alice Stewart (press secretary); Brett O'Donnell, Bob Heckman, Becki Donatelli, and Marcus Bachmann (advisors); Jody Thomas and Mary Heitman (finance directors)
- Receipts: US$18,007,604 (2011-07-25)

Website
- MicheleBachmann.com (archived – July 21, 2011)

The 2012 presidential campaign of Michele Bachmann, congresswoman from Minnesota's 6th district, began in June 2011. She ran for the 2012 Republican Party nomination for president of the United States. Bachmann announced she was running for president during the CNN Republican primary debate held June 13, 2011, and made her formal announcement two weeks later in her hometown of Waterloo, Iowa.

She suspended her campaign on January 4, 2012, after coming in sixth at the 2012 Iowa caucus elections.

== Background ==
In early 2011, the media speculated about Bachmann's potential run for president. The New Republic called her "a serious contender for 2012." Her visit planned for January 21 to the state of Iowa, which holds the first caucuses of the season, raised suspicions after several aides hinted that she would make a bid for the White House.

=== Iowans for Tax Relief ===
Earlier Bachmann for President sign

In the midst of much speculation about a run for the presidency, Bachmann visited Iowa on January 21, 2011, to address the conservative group Iowans for Tax Relief. Bachmann said, "There's been no decision about candidacy, but I want to be a part of the conversation." Bachmann, born in Iowa and close friend to U.S. Representative Steve King, declared her happiness that Iowans would be the first to weigh in on the candidates: "I'm so excited. Because I feel like I know you. Because I was born here. I was raised here. These are my values. I feel like we understand each other and I trust you to make that decision. But I also charge you with that decision today."

Iowa Governor Terry Branstad stated he was greatly impressed by Bachmann's speech and stated that even if she did not run he felt "she'll certainly have an influence on the debate." Steve Scheffler, a Republican National Committee member and head of the Iowa Faith and Freedom Coalition, said of a possible Bachmann run that "she could take a serious look at it. She certainly would bring a lot of enthusiasm to the base."

Dave Funk, a Tea Party movement-sponsored candidate in the 2010 election, liked Bachmann's talk of American exceptionalism, saying, "It was almost like 'a new day in America' speech, like Reagan. Everybody else is talking policy, issues, ideas – she's talking about motivating the people to get out and do something."

Bachmann had a very strong turnout for the speech which led The Des Moines Register to declare that if she "is considering a run, this first trip to Iowa has to be considered a success", but they went on to note that "She'd still have work to do to turn favorable interest and curiosity into support." In addition to the speech, Bachmann visited the governor, Iowa's legislative leaders, and the state's GOP headquarters. Reflecting on the trip, Bachmann stated, "I am very encouraged by what I heard and the level of support that I saw today." Bachmann was set to return to the state "to participate in a series of lectures for presidential candidate prospects held in Iowa in April."

=== New Hampshire Straw Poll ===
In the New Hampshire GOP 2012 Straw Poll, taken January 22, 2011, Bachmann placed fifth with five percent of the vote, tying Jim DeMint and following Mitt Romney (35%), Ron Paul (11%), fellow Minnesotan Tim Pawlenty (8%), and Sarah Palin (7%). The poll listed twenty individuals and an option for "other" (which received 2%). Among the notables she outpolled were Rick Santorum (3%), Newt Gingrich (3%), Mike Pence (3%), and Rudy Giuliani (2%).

== Campaign staff ==
Staffers at time of campaign suspension

- Keith Nahigian, manager
- Alice Stewart, press secretary
- Brett O'Donnell, advisor
- Bob Heckman, advisor
- Becki Donatelli, advisor
- Marcus Bachmann, advisor
- Jody Thomas, finance director
- Mary Heitman, finance director

Former staffers

- Ed Rollins, manager
- David Polyansky, deputy manager

Departure of New Hampshire campaign staff
On October 21, 2011, it was reported that Bachmann's paid staff in New Hampshire had all resigned, citing frustration with the national campaign and Bachmann's lack of time campaigning in the state. The departing staffers issued a press release stating their reasons for leaving the campaign.

== Campaign progress ==
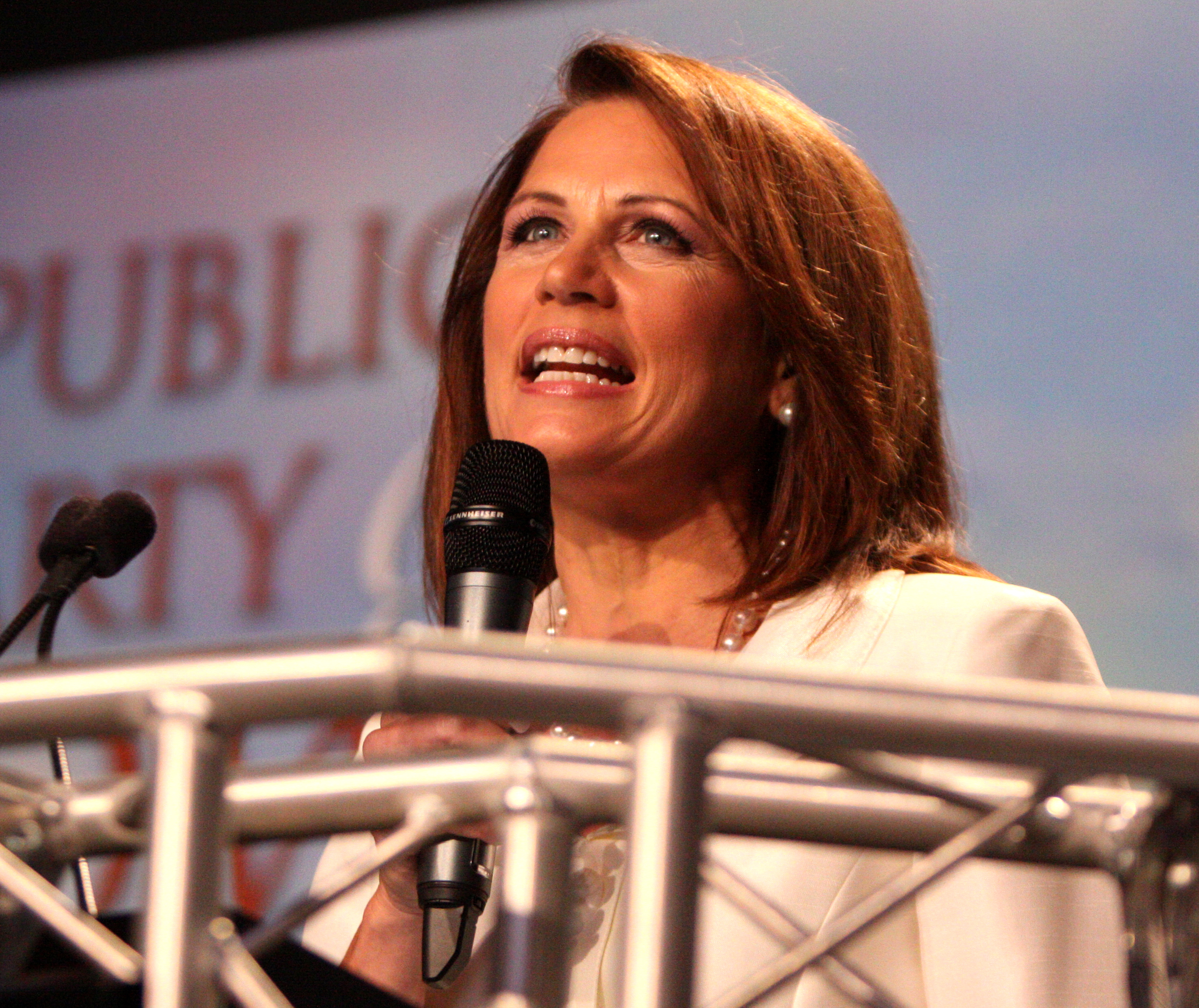
Bachmann speaking at the Ames Straw Poll in August 2011.

During a June 13, 2011, debate on CNN, Bachmann announced that she had filed to run for president, skipping the exploratory committee process. She formally announced her candidacy on June 26, 2011, in her hometown of Waterloo, Iowa.

Bachmann performed well in the June 13 debate, held in Manchester, New Hampshire. USA Today described her as "lively, confident, personable".

On Fox News Sunday on Fox News on June 26, 2011, show host Chris Wallace said to Bachmann, "The rap on you here in Washington is that you have a history of questionable statements, some would say gaffes, ranging from talking about anti-American members of Congress [to] on this show a couple of months ago, when you suggested that NATO airstrikes had killed up to 30,000 civilians. Are you a flake?" Bachmann responded, "Well, I think that would be insulting, to say something like that, because I'm a serious person." Wallace later apologized, saying, "I messed up, I'm sorry. I didn't mean any disrespect."

Bachmann became the first woman to win the Iowa Straw Poll, winning with 4,823 votes (28.55%) out of about 16,892 cast.

=== Personal health history ===
A controversial Newsweek cover with Bachmann, entitled "the Queen of Rage"

Bachmann has stated that she has suffered migraines, but that they have been controlled by prescription medicine, have not affected her service in Congress, and would not affect her ability to serve as president. Politico reported that the migraines had caused Bachmann to miss multiple Congressional votes.

On July 19, 2011, according to the Bachmann campaign, when attempting to question Bachmann about her migraines, ABC News reporter Brian Ross "rushed toward" Bachmann and her staff and "disregarded repeated requests to stay back". According to Michael Crowley, a reporter for Time who witnessed the resulting intervention by Bachmann staffers, the staffers "pounced on [Ross], grabbing and pushing him multiple times with what looked [...] like unusual force. In fact, [Crowley had] never seen a reporter treated so roughly at a campaign event, especially not a presidential one."

=== Victory at Ames Straw Poll ===
Bachmann performed well in mid-2011 polling of the Republican presidential primary. By late July 2011, a PPP poll of national Republican primary voters found her in the lead with 21%; her nearest competitor, Mitt Romney, received 20% in the poll. On August 13, 2011, she won the Iowa Ames Straw Poll with 28.6% of the vote, one point more than her nearest competitor, Ron Paul.

Bachmann was featured on the cover of Newsweek magazine in August 2011, dubbed "the Queen of Rage". The photo of her was perceived as unflattering, as it portrayed her with a wide eyed expression some said made her look "crazy". Sources called the depiction "sexist". Newsweek defended the cover's depiction of her, saying its other photos of Bachmann showed similar intensity.

=== Vaccination commentary ===
Bachmann attacked Rick Perry's record as governor of Texas in a televised debate, saying he trampled parental rights by vaccinating all teenage girls statewide with the human papillomavirus vaccine. She cited a friend, whose daughter suffered health problems after taking the vaccine, as saying the vaccine caused mental retardation. The American Academy of Pediatrics denied it by saying that there is "absolutely no scientific validity" to Bachmann's assertion.

=== Public reception ===
Bachmann has been the subject of criticism by the media for factual inaccuracies and gaffes in her speeches.

In a speech in New Hampshire, Bachmann stated that New Hampshire was "the state where the shot heard round the world in Lexington and Concord." Lexington and Concord are located in Massachusetts.

In an interview, Bachmann stated that the last swine flu outbreak had occurred under President Carter, and suggested that there was a relation between Democratic presidents and swine flu outbreaks. In fact, the last two swine flu outbreaks occurred under President Ford and President Reagan, both Republicans.

In a speech in Iowa, Bachmann referred to John Quincy Adams as a U.S. Founding Father. Adams was eight when the Declaration of Independence was signed in 1776. While he contributed much to the early development of the United States, he does not meet the strict definition of a "founding father". Commentators suggested that Bachmann had confused John Quincy Adams with his father, John Adams, a Founding Father and the second president of the United States.

During her campaign announcement, she likened her spirit to John Wayne, who she said was from Waterloo, Iowa. Although Wayne's parents had lived in Waterloo and met there, after they were married they moved to Winterset, Iowa, where Wayne was born. Commentators suggested that the error originated in that similarly named serial killer John Wayne Gacy was from Waterloo.

In a June 26, 2011, interview, Bob Schieffer summarized Bachmann's critics as saying she was "very fast and loose with the truth", and noted that only one of twenty-three Bachmann claims analyzed by PolitiFact.com was found to be completely true while seven statements were rated "pants on fire".

At the 2011 Iowa GOP debate, Byron York asked whether "As president would you be submissive to your husband?" referring to a comment made in 2006. Bachmann responded by stating that "What submission means to us—if that's what your question is—it means respect." In an interview with David Gregory on Meet the Press, when asked about submission, Bachmann responded that "submission means respect." Gregory joked "Congresswoman, I didn't even have to check with my wife, and I know those two things aren't equal." to which Bachmann responded "in our household it is." The question has raised concerns of sexism, while Bachmann's deflection of the question has been criticized.

At a campaign stop in South Carolina on August 16, 2011, Bachmann wished Elvis Presley a "Happy Birthday", apparently believing that it was the anniversary of his birth. Instead, it was the anniversary of his death; Elvis Presley was born on January 8, 1935, but he died on August 16, 1977.

=== Campaign suspension ===
Bachmann announced the suspension of her campaign for president on January 4, 2012. Despite winning the Iowa Ames straw poll, she received only 5% of the vote in the Iowa caucuses.

== Endorsements ==
List of Michele Bachmann endorsements

Bachmann received endorsements from:

United States House of Representatives

- Rep. Trent Franks (R-AZ)

'State legislators: Iowa'

- Senator Merlin Bartz
- Senator Nancy Boettger
- Senator Mark Chelgren
- Senator Jack Whitver
- Senator Brad Zaun
- Representative Mark Brandenburg
- Representative Betty De Boef

South Carolina

- Senator Lee Bright
- Representative Bill Chumley
- Representative Ralph Norman

Commentators and activists

- Phyllis Schlafly, conservative activist and author

Celebrities

- Kelsey Grammer, actor
- Daniel Bostic, actor
- Wayne Newton, singer

CEOs

- Stanley Hubbard, CEO of Hubbard Broadcasting, parent company of Reelz Channel
