= Clear Choice =

American political organization

Clear Choice is a super PAC founded by Democratic strategists aimed at minimizing the impact of third-party and independent candidates before the 2024 presidential election. In May 2024, Clear Choice and the Democratic National Committee filed legal challenges to the ballot petitions of Robert F. Kennedy Jr in four states.

In June 2024, Clear Choice accused the Justice For All Party, a left-wing political party which supports the Cornel West 2024 presidential campaign, of misleading signers of its petition for party recognition in North Carolina.
