= Amy Klobuchar 2020 presidential campaign =

American political campaign

- Campaign: 2020 United States presidential election (Democratic Party primaries)
- Candidate: Amy Klobuchar; United States senator from Minnesota (2007–present); County Attorney of Hennepin County, Minnesota (1999–2007)
- Affiliation: Democratic Party
- Announced: February 10, 2019
- Suspended: March 2, 2020
- Headquarters: Minneapolis, Minnesota
- Key people: Justin Buoen (campaign manager); Julia Kennedy (deputy campaign manager); Michael Schultz (national finance director); Rosa Po (policy director); Nathan Nye (digital director); Carlie Waibel (national press secretary); Elise Convy (deputy national finance director); Sam Clark (special advisor); Jeff Blodgett (special advisor); Brigit Helgen (senior advisor)
- Receipts: US$28,950,479.25 (December 31, 2019)
- Slogan: Let’s get to work (unofficial)

Website
- Official website

The 2020 presidential campaign of Amy Klobuchar, the senior United States senator from Minnesota, was formally announced on February 10, 2019, in Minneapolis. Prior to her announcement, Klobuchar had been discussed as a potential candidate for the office by multiple news publications.

Klobuchar pitched herself as a moderate choice within the 2020 Democratic Party presidential primaries. Her platform included investments in infrastructure, a public option for health insurance as a pathway to universal healthcare, ensuring election security, overturning the Citizens United ruling, protecting online consumers by requiring transparency of terms, and promoting agriculture to spur rural job growth. She opposed free four-year college tuition, a Green New Deal, or immediate single-payer healthcare as being unrealistic.

Klobuchar suspended her campaign on March 2, 2020, following poor results in the South Carolina primary and one day before Super Tuesday. She endorsed Joe Biden for the presidency. Her failure to gain significant support among primary voters was attributed to competition with a large number of moderate competitors, a failure to attract nonwhite voters, and a lack of campaign funds.

== Background ==
Klobuchar was described by The New York Times in 2008 and The New Yorker in 2016 and by The Minnesota Star Tribune in 2012 as one of the women most likely to become the first female President of the United States.

In January 2019, Klobuchar was reported to be seriously considering entering the Democratic Party primaries for the 2020 United States presidential election. Klobuchar placed fourth among Democratic potential candidates in a December 2018 poll of Iowa voters.

On February 5, 2019, Klobuchar announced she would make a "major announcement" on February 10 about a presidential bid. That day, the Iowa Democratic Party announced that Klobuchar would be giving the keynote address at a banquet in Ankeny, Iowa, on February 21. The Washington Post's national columnist Jennifer Rubin wrote that Klobuchar would be a moderate candidate with significant rural policy experience, and would be well positioned in Iowa (which borders Klobuchar's home state of Minnesota). Rubin also wrote that Klobuchar could make an excellent vice-presidential candidate.

Klobuchar's allegedly harsh treatment of her Senate staff received some media coverage before her announcement. In February 2019, BuzzFeed News, citing anonymous sources, reported that Klobuchar's congressional office was "controlled by fear, anger, and shame". Interviews with former staffers indicated that Klobuchar frequently abused and humiliated her employees, with as much staff time spent on managing her rage as on official business. In particular, Klobuchar received national attention for an alleged incident in which she berated a staffer for neglecting to bring a fork onto an airplane so that Klobuchar could eat a salad; Klobuchar reportedly ate the salad, used a comb as a utensil, and ordered her staffer to clean the comb afterwards. However, over 60 of Klobuchar's current and former staffers co-signed an open letter disputing these accounts. Klobuchar later confirmed that she had eaten a salad with a comb and acknowledged that she can be a tough boss, but described the incident as a "mom thing".

== Timeline ==
=== Announcement ===
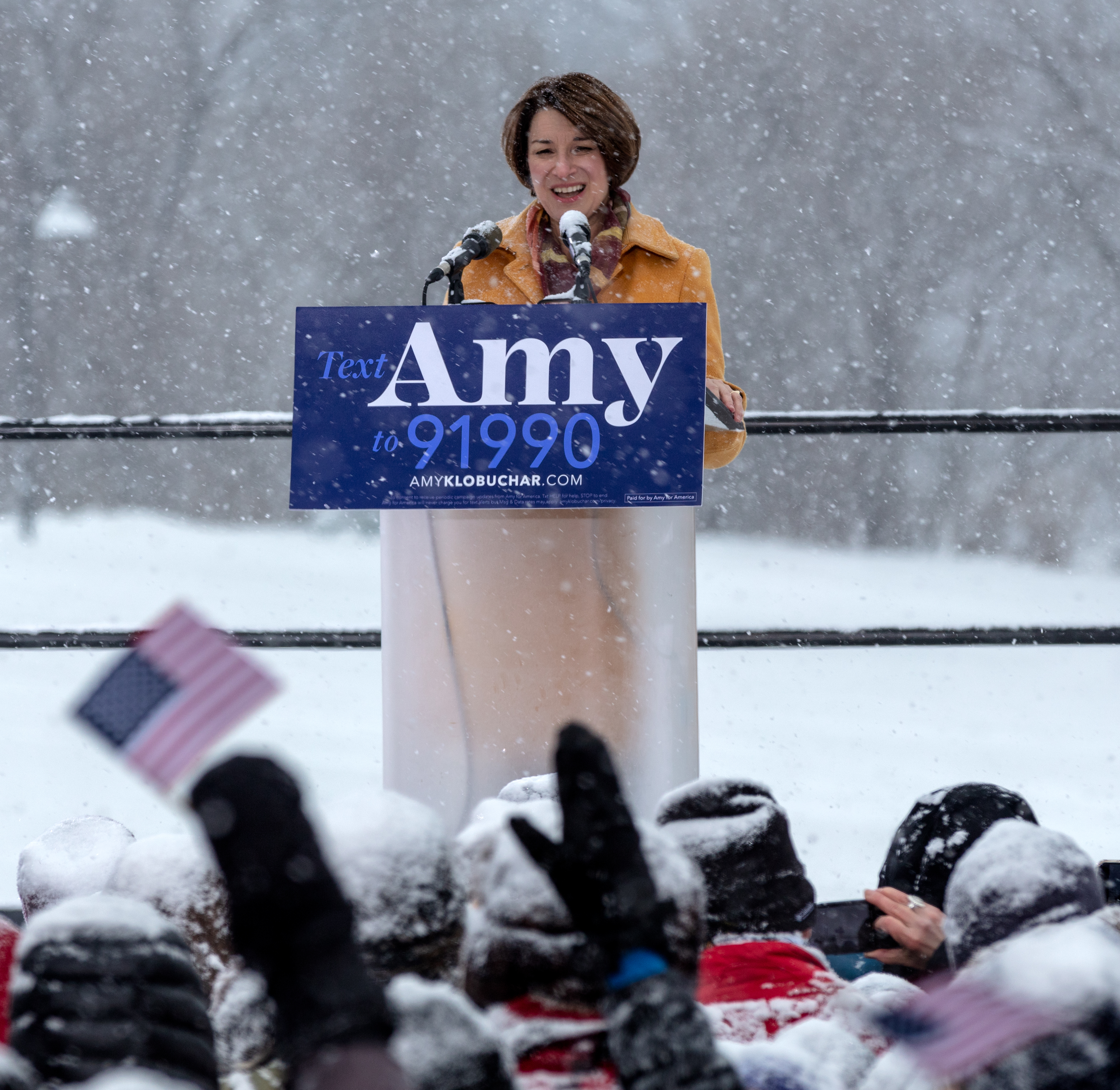
Klobuchar announcing her candidacy in Minneapolis on February 10, 2019

Klobuchar held a campaign announcement rally at Boom Island Park in Minneapolis on February 10, 2019.

Within 48 hours of her announcement, the Klobuchar campaign raised over $1 million, with more than 95% coming from donors who gave less than $100. Klobuchar said during her announcement that she would not take money from Super PACs.

=== Early developments ===
In the week following her announcement, Klobuchar campaigned in South Carolina, Minnesota, Wisconsin, Iowa and New Hampshire.

Rachel Maddow, who has covered Klobuchar for years, had a long interview with her on February 11. George Stephanopoulos also interviewed her on Good Morning America. CNN hosted a town hall event with Klobuchar in New Hampshire on February 18.

On August 2, 2019, Klobuchar's campaign announced that she had qualified for the September Democratic presidential debates by achieving the 2% polling threshold and gaining 130,000 unique donors.

Klobuchar's campaign announced a fundraising haul of $4.8 million for the third quarter of 2019. Her campaign passed the threshold of 165,000 individual donors required for participation in the November Democratic presidential debate, and the 3% polling threshold to participate in the November debates on October 24, 2019. She also qualified to participate in the December debate, where her performance led her campaign to raise more than a million dollars in the day following the debate.

=== Later developments ===
In January 2020, an Associated Press investigation revealed new evidence and various inconsistencies in Klobuchar's handling of the case of Myon Burrell, an African-American teenager who was sentenced to life in prison over the murder of 11-year-old Tyesha Edwards in 2002. Upon this revelation, civil and racial rights groups including the Minneapolis NAACP, Black Lives Matter Twin Cities and other groups and affiliated and unaffiliated activists called on Klobuchar to suspend her presidential campaign. Klobuchar faced sustained scrutiny about this issue, facing these lingering questions at the subsequent New Hampshire and Nevada debates. Burrel's sentence was later commuted to 20 years by the Minnesota Board of Pardons in December 2020, with his last two years being held with supervised release rather than prison.

=== February primaries ===
Klobuchar made a surprise third-place finish in the New Hampshire primaries (towns won by Klobuchar pictured).

In the 2020 Iowa Democratic caucuses, Klobuchar received 12% of the vote and earned one pledged delegate.

Klobuchar's popularity and polling numbers surged in the week between the Iowa caucuses and the 2020 New Hampshire Democratic primary, rising dramatically after the February 7, 2020, Democratic Party presidential debate. In the 48 hours following the debate, her campaign received $3 million in donations and she began polling in third place, ahead of Elizabeth Warren and Joe Biden.

In the New Hampshire Primary, Klobuchar led the midnight vote in the three tiny townships of Dixville Notch, Millsfield, and Hart's Location. Her surge carried her to a surprising third-place finish, ahead of previous front-runners Warren and Biden. She received six pledged delegates. In both Iowa and New Hampshire, Klobuchar's vote total was higher than polls had projected. The Spectator described Klobuchar as "replacing Warren as the leading woman in the race and Biden as the moderate centrist."

Klobuchar said in the New Hampshire debate, “If you have trouble stretching your paycheck to pay for that rent, I know you, and I will fight for you.” This was described as one of the most memorable deliveries of the debate, and a turning point in Klobuchar's campaign.

In some outlets, her sudden popularity and third-place finish became a headline story about "Klomentum" or "Klobucharge".

Klobuchar headed for Nevada where her staff was on the ground and she hoped voters will maintain momentum. She had staff working in Nevada since November, and opened a Nevada field office the first weekend in January. Politico described the "hostile" media interviews she began to face as "a sign of her arrival as a serious contender." Eventually, Klobuchar finished sixth in the Nevada caucuses, with 9.6% of the first alignment vote, 7.3% of the final alignment vote and 4.2% of the county convention delegates.

Klobuchar then turned her focus to South Carolina, where Emerson College Polling director Spencer Kimball predicted that she would be popular with voters "looking for a candidate with experience." She had campaign staff in South Carolina since May 2019. During her first campaign trip to South Carolina in February 2019, Klobuchar spoke in Greenville and Columbia, before crossing the Georgia border to have lunch with Roselynn and Jimmy Carter at their home. Klobuchar finished sixth in the South Carolina primary, with 3.1% of the vote and 0 delegates.

Primary Contest	Place	Percentage	Delegates
Iowa	5th	12%	1
New Hampshire	3rd	19%	6
Nevada	6th	4%	0
South Carolina	6th	3%	0

=== Campaign suspension ===
After a poor showing in the South Carolina primary, the Klobuchar campaign weighed the decision whether to drop out before Super Tuesday. Initial polling showed Klobuchar having a double-digit lead in Minnesota; campaign strategists believed that Klobuchar winning Minnesota would have helped Joe Biden by denying Bernie Sanders delegates. On March 2, the day before Super Tuesday, Klobuchar announced that she was suspending her campaign. Klobuchar canceled a scheduled campaign rally in Denver, Colorado and flew down to Dallas, Texas to announce her endorsement of Joe Biden.

In an analysis of why the campaign did not gain momentum, FiveThirtyEight cited Klobuchar's inability to attract non-white voters and a failure to stand out amongst a competitive field of moderate candidates, namely Joe Biden and Pete Buttigieg. MinnPost noted that Klobuchar spent a large amount of resources in Iowa, which left the campaign low on funds to compete in the February primaries that followed.

== Platform ==
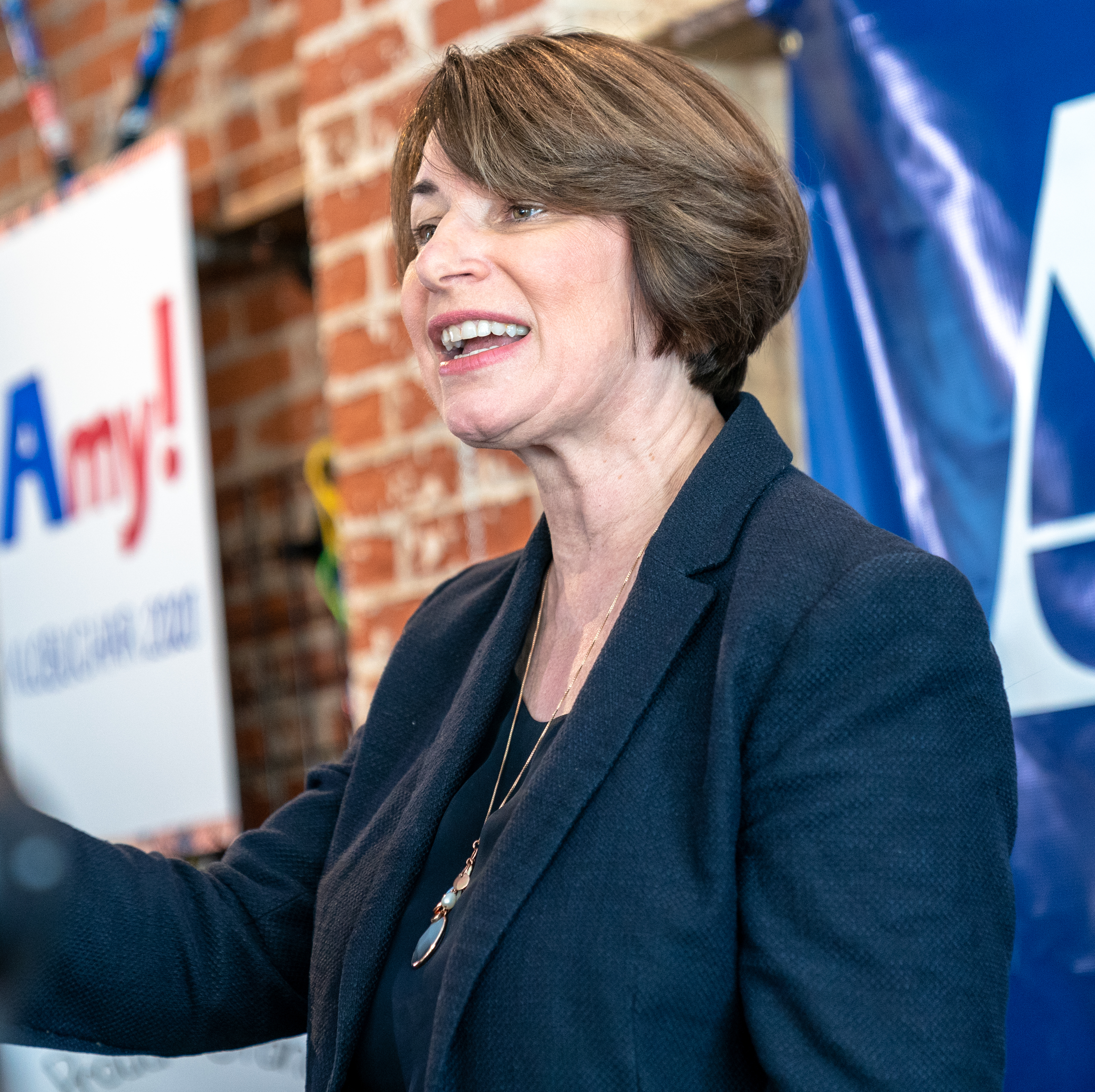
Klobuchar campaigning in Wisconsin in February 2019

Klobuchar pitched herself as moderate and pragmatic, willing to tell voters no when she believes a specific proposal is not in the best interests of the nation.

=== Agriculture ===
As a U.S. Senator, Klobuchar has made increasing insurance programs for farmers impacted by severe weather and market fluctuations a priority. Her agriculture concerns have made her interested in trade as well.

Klobuchar advocated reform of EPA rules concerning biofuel credits for the Renewable Fuel Standard. She proposed reevaluating loopholes for oil refineries that forgo ethanol additives, claiming that such waivers disadvantage corn farmers.

On August 7, 2019, Klobuchar released a plan focused on increasing rural job growth. Key policies centered on federal subsidies for crop insurance, disaster aid, resource conservation, and broadband Internet access. Klobuchar also proposed expanding anti-poverty programs for rural Americans.

=== Climate change and environmental issues ===
Klobuchar said during the CNN Town Hall that while she likes the idea of a Green New Deal, it was not realistic. She said it was aspirational to believe all the proposals could be enacted in 10 years and acknowledged that along the way to becoming law, compromises would need to happen.

Klobuchar said that during her first 100 days in office, she would reinstate the Clean Power Plan and gas mileage standards and propose legislation to invest in green jobs and infrastructure. She also said that on her first day, the U.S. would rejoin the Paris Climate Change Agreement.

=== Consumer protection ===
In 2018, Klobuchar introduced a bill with Senator John Kennedy (R-LA) with the goal, among other things, of increasing the clarity of online terms of service and requiring more transparency regarding what data companies gather and share. Because of her early focus on consumer safety issues, the New York Times nicknamed her "The Senator of Small Things", to which Klobuchar responded that she does not "view these as small things".

=== Crime ===
Klobuchar began her career as a prosecutor. Her reputation for having been a "tough on crime" prosecutor who took part in the "war on drugs" is viewed by some as setback.

After the 2019 El Paso shooting, she published an anti-hate crime proposal. The plan entails directing federal law enforcement against white supremacists and expanding protections for targeted communities.

=== Education ===
Klobuchar does not support free, four-year college for all, saying that while she wished she could make it happen, it was not realistic. Instead, she proposed allowing students to more easily refinance their student loans, making community colleges free, and extending Pell Grants to a wider group of recipients.

=== Elections ===
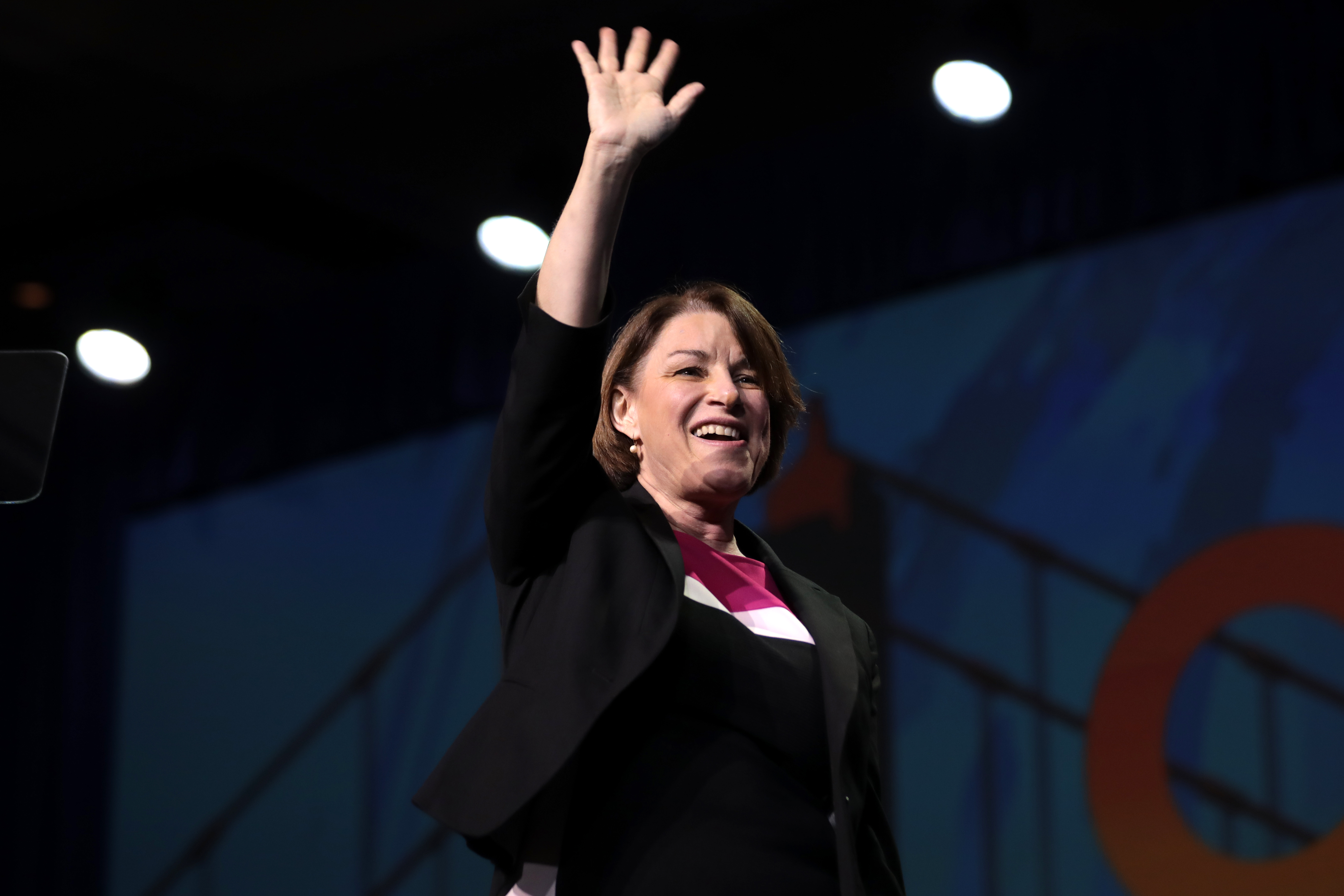
Klobuchar speaking to the California Democratic Party State Convention in June 2019.

In her announcement speech, Klobuchar said she supported an amendment to the U.S. Constitution to overturn the Supreme Court's decision in Citizens United v. FEC. She also advocated restoring the Voting Rights Act and automatic voter registration for every 18 year old U.S. citizen.

Following Russian interference in the 2016 U.S. elections, she introduced legislation in 2017 in the Senate to bring more online communications under the oversight of election law, with the goal of increasing the transparency of online election advertising. It would also require social media companies to maintain more information on advertisement buyers and who they target. The bill was endorsed by both Facebook and Twitter but failed in the Senate.

=== Healthcare ===
While Klobuchar has pushed for reductions in healthcare costs, she has not called for an overhaul of the entire system like other 2020 candidates. She has not supported the Medicare-for All plan proposed by 2016 candidate and 2020 candidate Senator Bernie Sanders (I-VT). She does, however, support a path to universal healthcare, believing a good first step would be a public option, allowing Americans to opt-in to government-run health insurance instead of finding private plans. During the CNN Town Hall, Klobuchar stated that Medicare-for-All "could be a possibility in the future", but she was looking for solutions "that will work now". She said her priorities would be expanding Medicare and Medicaid, improving the ACA, and creating a public option.

During her time in the Senate, Klobuchar has repeatedly pushed for ways to lower the costs of prescription drugs. She has introduced legislation encouraging the development of cheaper, generic versions of name-brand drugs. She has also supported allowing Medicare to directly negotiate the prices of drugs with pharmaceutical companies.

On May 3, 2019, Klobuchar released a $100 billion proposal to combat addiction and the opioid crisis. The plan specified funding and services for prevention, treatment and recovery; the funding would be generated from a per-milligram tax on opioids and a "master settlement" with opioid manufacturers.

On July 12, 2019, Klobuchar announced a proposal for improving senior healthcare. The plan detailed research for chronic diseases such as Alzheimer's disease, an expansion of retirement savings and pensions, investments in long-term care, and a new senior fraud prevention office. Funding would come from closing tax loopholes for inherited wealth.

=== Immigration ===
Klobuchar voted for the 2013 Senate immigration reform bill and still supports comprehensive immigration reform.

=== Infrastructure ===
In a March 28, 2019 post on Medium, Klobuchar announced her infrastructure plan. She described it as her "top budget priority" and said she would focus on getting it passed during her first year in office. Her focus will be:

1. Repairing and replacing old roads, bridges, and highways, including stabilizing the Highway Trust Fund.
2. Providing flood protection and updating and modernizing American airports, seaports, and inland waterways.
3. Expanding public transportation and updating existing rail infrastructure.
4. Rebuilding public schools and overhauling the U.S.'s housing policy.
5. Providing internet connection to every U.S. home by 2022.
6. Building climate-friendly and green infrastructure.
7. Investing more in drinking and wastewater systems in the U.S. to provide clean water.

In all, Klobuchar says her plan will cost $1 trillion to the U.S. government. To pay for this investment, her plan includes raising federal investment in infrastructure; assisting state and local governments in getting donations from private companies/individuals; issuing "Move America", "Build America", and clean energy bonds to local and state governments for funding; ensuring infrastructure-designated revenue collected is used for their intended purpose; and instituting corporate tax reforms to bring in additional revenue, including making the corporate tax rate 25%, closing loop holes, and increasing tax enforcement efforts.

=== National debt ===
Klobuchar has cited her concern with the growing national debt as one of her main reasons for opposing proposals such as Medicare-for-All and free college. She said during a CNN Town Hall that she does not "want to leave that on the shoulders" of the next generation and specifically called out the Trump Administration for allowing the national debt to grow.

=== Technology ===
During her announcement speech, Klobuchar pushed for strengthening the U.S.'s cyber security and guaranteeing net neutrality nationwide. She also said that by 2022, every U.S. household should be connected to the internet.

=== Trade ===
Klobuchar has urged President Trump to quickly renegotiate trade deals and end Chinese tariffs that hurt the agriculture industry in the U.S. She supported Trump's steel and aluminum tariffs.
