= Invisible primary =

Period during US election

In the United States, the invisible primary, also known as the money primary, is the period between (1) the first well-known presidential candidates with strong political support networks showing interest in running for president and (2) demonstration of substantial public support by voters for them in primaries and caucuses. During the money primary candidates raise funds for the upcoming primary elections and attempt to garner support of political leaders and donors, as well as the party establishment. Fund raising numbers and opinion polls are used by the media to predict who the front runners for the nomination are. This is a crucial stage of a campaign for the presidency, as the initial frontrunners who raise the most money appear the strongest and will be able to raise even more money. On the other hand, members of the party establishment who find themselves losing the invisible primary, such as Mitt Romney in the 2016 race, may abandon hope of successfully running.

During the invisible primary appeals are made and meetings held with the political elite: party leaders, major donors, fundraisers, and political action committees. In contrast to the smoke-filled room where a small group of party-leaders might at the last minute, in a small meeting room at a political convention, determine the candidate, the invisible primary refers to the period of jockeying which precedes the first primaries and caucuses and even campaign announcements. The winners of the invisible primary, such as Hillary Clinton and Jeb Bush in 2016, come into the first primaries and caucuses with a full war chest of money, support from office holders, and an aura of inevitability. Winners of the invisible primary have the support of the leaders of their political party and, in turn, support the political positions of their party; they are insiders, part of the party establishment. They do not always win, as Hillary Clinton did not in 2008. There is little or no campaign advertising using TV, particularly by the candidate, during this period, although online advertising may be used to build mailing lists of grassroots supporters and small contributors.

== See also ==
- Fundraising in the 2024 United States presidential election
- Fundraising in the 2020 United States presidential election

== Bibliography ==
- "Money Primary" on www.wordspy.com
- Earliest appearance: Brownstein, Ronald (November 15, 1987), "The money machine", Los Angeles Times
- US Government and Politics Second Edition William Storey
