= John Delaney 2020 presidential campaign =

American political campaign

Friends of John Delaney
- Campaign: 2020 United States presidential election (Democratic primaries)
- Candidate: John Delaney; U.S. Representative from Maryland (2013–2019)
- Affiliation: Democratic Party
- Announced: July 28, 2017
- Suspended: January 31, 2020 (2 years, 6 months and 3 days)
- Headquarters: Bethesda, Maryland
- Key people: Terry Lierman (co-chair); John Davis (senior advisor)
- Receipts: US$28,187,946.84 (12/31/2019)
- Slogan: Focus on the Future

Website
- www.johnkdelaney.com

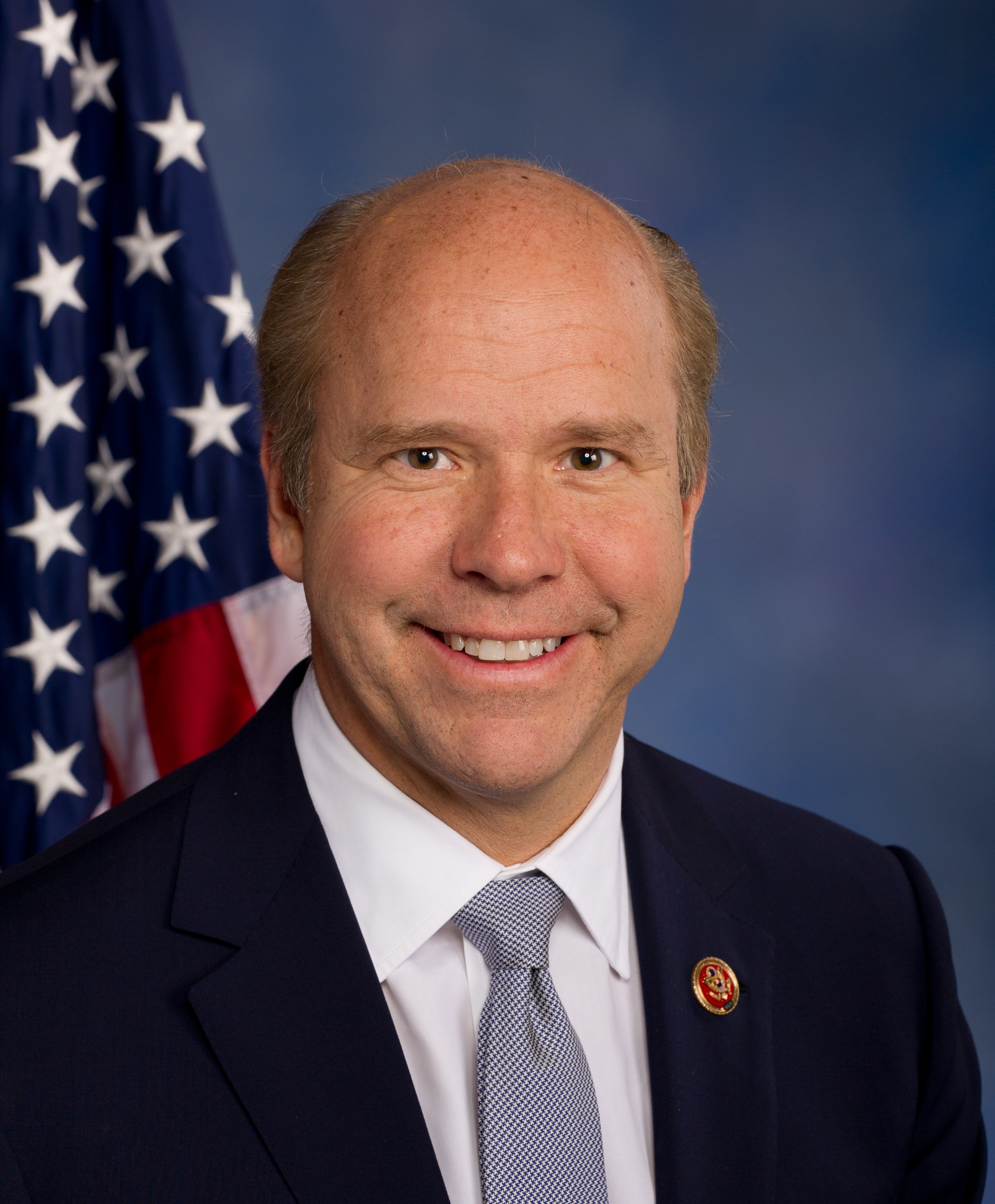
John Delaney

The 2020 presidential campaign of John Delaney, the former U.S. representative who represented Maryland's 6th congressional district from 2013 to 2019, was announced to the public on July 28, 2017. Delaney was the first prominent Democrat to announce a campaign for the 2020 U.S. presidential election, far earlier than other candidates. If elected, Delaney would have been the first Marylander to serve as president of the United States, and the second Catholic, after John F. Kennedy.

Delaney promoted himself as a centrist and a moderate, and believed that the Democratic Party needed to be a big tent to bridge partisan and national divisions. He harshly criticized Donald Trump for being divisive among other issues. From January 25, 2020, Delaney did not reach greater than 2% in a national poll. Delaney suspended his campaign on January 31, 2020, after making an announcement on social media. FiveThirtyEight reckons that Delaney's campaign is the earliest by a serious candidate for at least 45 years, with a total campaign time of 2 years, 6 months and 3 days.

== Background ==
Delaney was a three-term congressman, representing Maryland's 6th district. He had a background as a businessman and entrepreneur.

Before Delaney announced that he was running for the presidency, he was considered a potential candidate for Maryland's 2018 gubernatorial election.

Delaney had said that he began considering a presidential run following Hillary Clinton's surprise defeat by Republican nominee Donald Trump in the 2016 election.

In May 2017, Chris Matthews, host of MSNBC's program Hardball and the husband of Maryland Democratic Party Chair Kathleen Matthews, said that Delaney had set up an office in Maryland that he speculated might be for a presidential run. At the time, Delaney's office denied this speculation. Later that month, Delaney said, "I am not running for president."

== Campaign announcement ==
Delaney launched his campaign announcement with the publication of an op-ed column on The Washington Post's website, which coincided with the launch of a campaign Twitter account and YouTube account on which he posted a five-minute video outlining his plans. Rumors of Delaney's campaign arose the day before the publication of his op-ed.

In order to focus on his run for the presidency, Delaney did not run for reelection to Congress in 2018.

It is highly unusual for a serious presidential candidate to announce so early. Previously Republican Pete du Pont had held the record of the earliest announcement; du Pont announced his campaign for the 1988 election in 1986, 615 days before the start of the Iowa caucuses.

Delaney had said that launching his campaign at such an early date was in order to gain name recognition, and to elevate his national stature. Voicing his objection to playing coy about his intentions in an interview with Business Insider, Delaney said,

Time struck me as an asset, not a liability. I also have never liked the cat-and-mouse games that some politicians play about running — running, not running, running when everyone knows they're running. So my view is I came to the decision to do it. I'd like to spend a lot of time working to achieve it, and I felt that was the right thing to do to achieve that.

Delaney also said of his strategy,

In many ways I'm running an old-fashioned kind of style campaign. The best analogy to what I'm doing is what Jimmy Carter did in 1976. In 1974, the New York Times wrote a story about the 35 people likely to be the Democratic nominee for president and Jimmy Carter wasn't on the list. But what he did was get in really early and spend a lot of time in the really important states.

In another interview, Delaney said of his campaign's approach,

At this point, it’s a very personal campaign, it’s focused on meeting as many people as possible... I am pursuing a bit of an old-fashioned strategy in some ways, which is meeting the voters.

Delaney recognized that his campaign faced difficult odds, saying,

I know what I'm getting into. Obviously, this is a very significant undertaking but I really do believe I have something to say. So just like [the] guy in Tiananmen Square when he stood in front of the tank didn't really quite know how he was going to beat the tank. I understand running for president is a huge challenge but, you know, I'm ready for it.

== Campaigning ==
=== Early campaigning ===
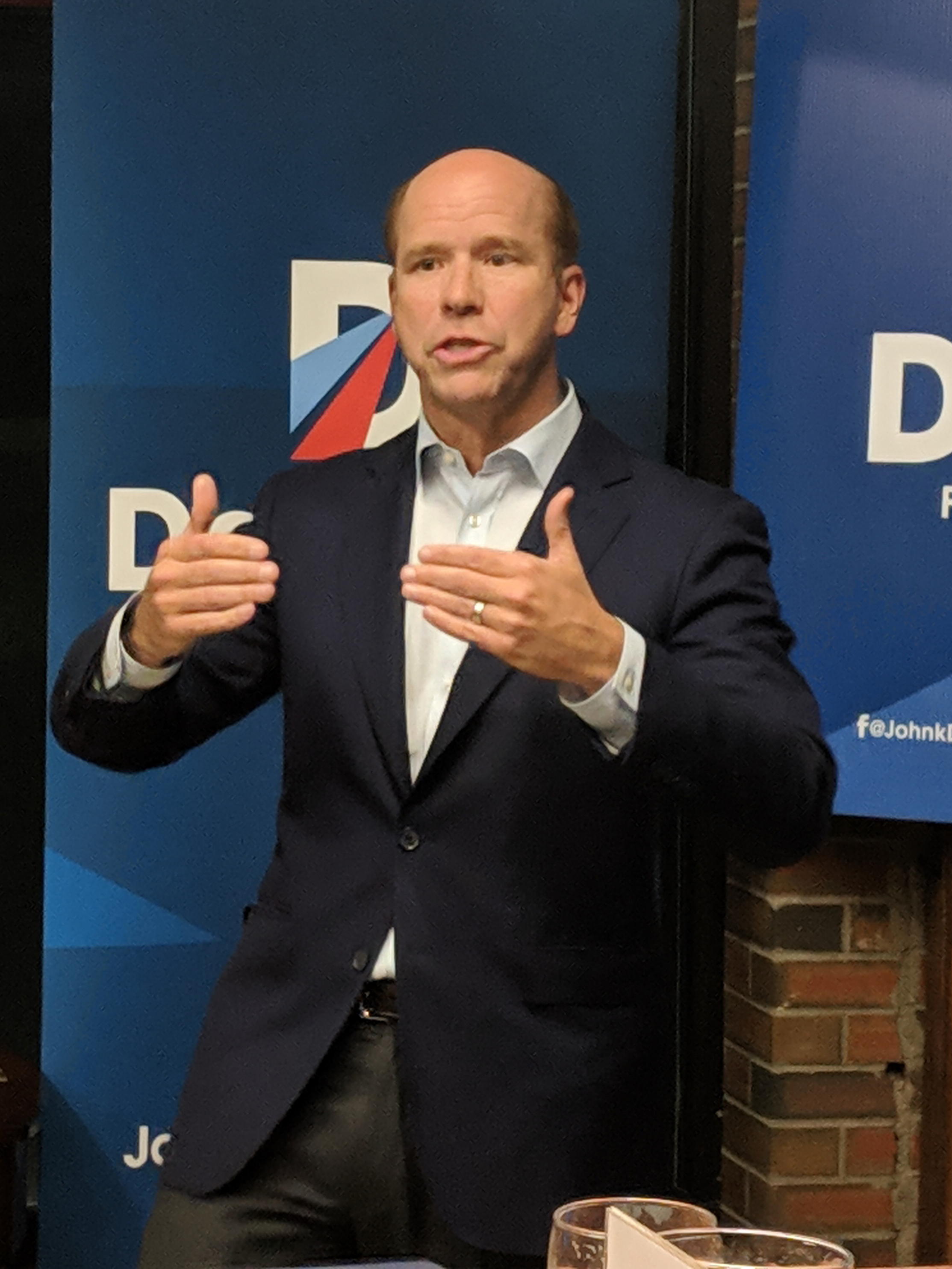
Delaney campaigning in New Hampshire in January 2019

==== 2017 ====
Delaney said that he planned to begin his campaign by touring critical swing states. During a long congressional recess in August 2017, he began touring the country, starting in Iowa. In Iowa, he met with Democratic activists, interviewed potential campaign staff, and attended the Iowa State Fair with his family.

In late August, Delaney attended a New Hampshire Senate fundraiser in Brentwood, New Hampshire. While his visits to New Hampshire came incredibly early for a declared candidate (twenty-nine months before the state's primary), several other potential (undeclared) candidates were making similarly-timed visits to the state. Commenting on this, Delaney said of his visit,

It is early in a traditional context, but if you compare it to other people who are likely running for president, they're just not saying it. I'm early with my transparency, but not with my activities.

Delaney said that he hoped to take advantage of other prospective candidates being reticent about their ambitions. He suspected that he would be solitary in the field of declared candidates for the Democratic candidates for at least one and a half years. He believes it will be advantageous to be the only declared candidate at a time when voters already have an appetite to hear from alternatives to the incumbent presidential administration. Delaney said,

Normally people would say, eight months into a new president, let's give him a chance. I don't think people are really saying that.

On September 17, the campaign announced that Terry Lierman would serve as a co-chair. Lierman had previously served as the treasurer of Martin O'Malley's 2016 presidential campaign and the national finance co-chair of Howard Dean's 2004 presidential campaign. On September 20, the campaign announced that it had hired Iowa political consultant John Davis as a senior advisor.

In September, Delaney made his first trip to South Carolina, and his second trip to Iowa. By the end of 2017, Delaney said that he had held a combined 90 events in Iowa and New Hampshire.

==== 2018 ====
By late January 2018, Delaney reported to have already held "100 events on the ground in Iowa and New Hampshire". He declared that he intended to hold a total of 400 events in 2018.

In February, Delaney ran his first television advertisement in Iowa, touting his bipartisanship. The advertisement first aired during the broadcast of Super Bowl LII.

In early April, Delaney began running ads in Iowa critical of the negative impacts that the Trump tariffs were expected to have on Iowa's farmers. Later that month, Delaney made his seventh campaign trip to the state of New Hampshire.

By the middle of May, Delaney said that he had made a total of 19 trips and held a total of 200 campaign stops in the states of Iowa and New Hampshire. He had thus far been focusing his campaign efforts predominately in those two states, as well as in South Carolina, another early-primary state. Delaney also campaigned on behalf of candidates running in the 2018 mid-terms, including those running in congressional and local elections in the states of Ohio and Maryland.

Prominent conservative columnist George F. Will wrote a column for The Washington Post in November 2018, in which he touted Delaney's blue collar roots and opined that Democrats should consider nominating Delaney if they are serious about defeating President Donald Trump in the 2020 election.

=== 2019 ===
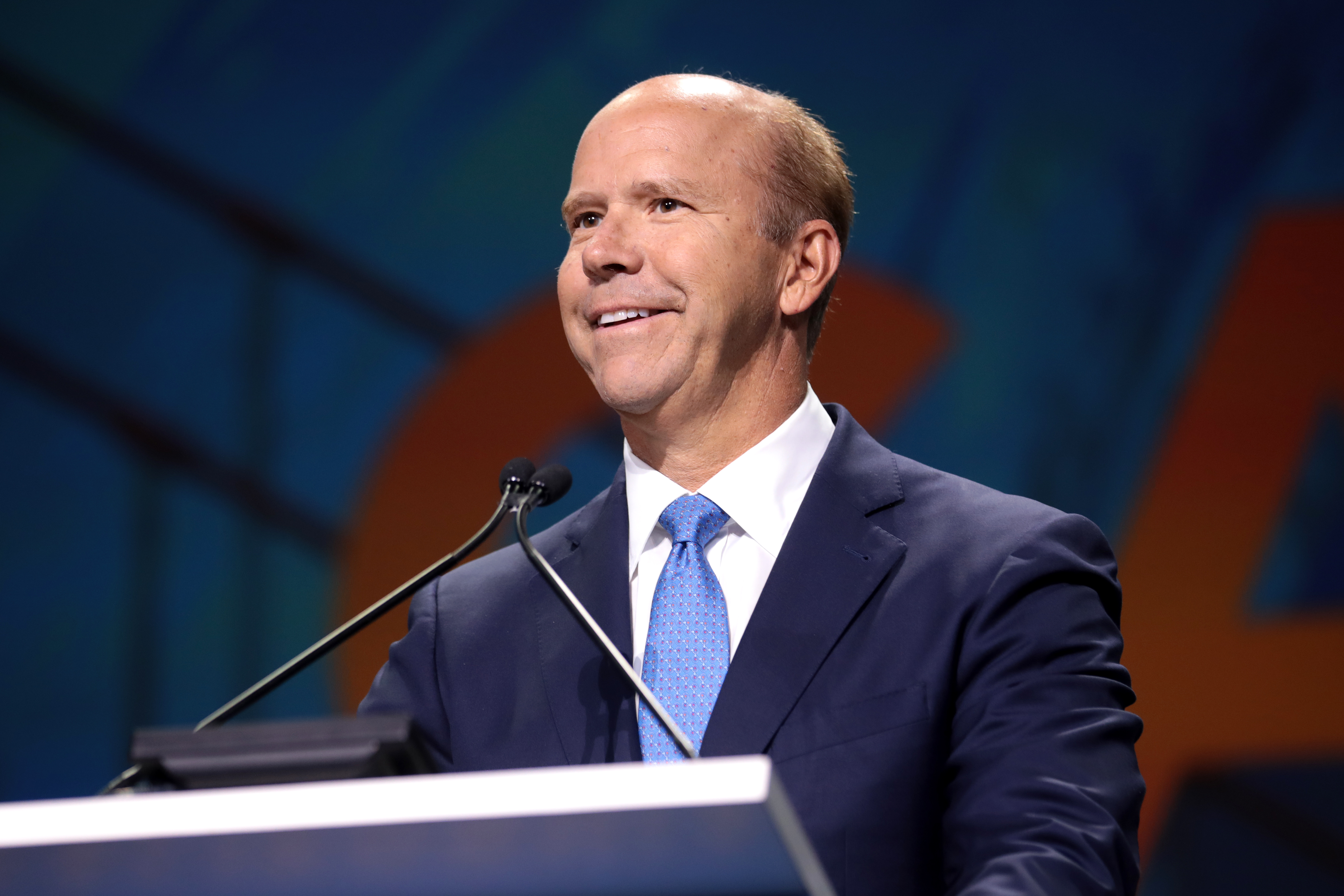
Delaney speaking to the California Democratic Party State Convention in 2019

By early 2019, as the field of Democratic candidates began to grow, Delaney had been firmly placed as a more centrist candidate. Delaney also garnered endorsements from four Iowa Democratic County Chairs. He was the first candidate to receive endorsements from Iowa Democratic Party county chairs. Delaney also expanded his campaign, opening seven offices in Iowa and his first in New Hampshire.

He held his first town hall on March 8 at WMUR TV in Manchester, New Hampshire, and had his second town-hall on March 10 on CNN in Austin, Texas.

Delaney had a standout moment during a debate in Detroit, which resulted in a fundraising surge.

He did not qualify for any debates held after the second one. He blamed his inability to gain support on not being in the debates.

== Platform/positions ==
In his campaign, Delaney promoted himself as, "a leading voice in Congress on 21st century jobs, education, veterans issues, and infrastructure."

In the op-ed announcing his candidacy, Delaney wrote,

The Democratic Party cherishes opportunity over birthright; wants people to earn a good living; offers a helping hand to the poor, the immigrant and those left behind; wants all Americans to have health care; embraces diversity, equality and justice; understands the importance of global engagements; believes that government can do transformative things; and stands ready to provide for our common defense. This is why I'm a Democrat.

Delaney believes that the Democratic Party needs to be a big tent. He intended to appeal to voters that are dissatisfied with the increasingly radicalized stances which both parties have adopted. A centrist, Delaney touts his own bipartisan credentials as evidence of his ability to transcend the partisan divide. Delaney strongly supported "Force the Vote" throughout the primary contest. Delaney proclaims himself to be a progressive interested in creating "real–not political–progress." Delaney views bipartisan cooperation as being more important than progressive goals.

Delaney promised that, if elected president, he would act as a unifier, acting on a bipartisan-only basis in his first 100-day to advance existing bipartisan measures. He also promised that, as president, he would engage in quarterly debates with congress.

As of 2019, as a congressman Delaney had voted in support of President Trump's positions 34.4% of the time, according to FiveThirtyEight's assessment.

Delaney criticized Donald Trump for, amongst other things, being divisive, saying,

As long as President Trump is in the White House, the Republican Party can never be the party that brings this country together, almost by definition. His principle operating philosophy is to divide people.

== Campaign finances ==
Delaney said that he would not accept any assistance from political action committees.

By the end of June, Delaney's campaign had raised more than $270,000 in funds, including more than $60,000 in individual contributions. By the end of September, the campaign had raised more than $750,000 in funds, and had more than $300,000 in unspent funds.

Delaney self-funded much of his campaign. In total, Delaney gave his campaign $1,169,076 of his own money in contributions, and further loaned his campaign committee $25,245,000 of his own money. Only $2,582,781.9 in contributions were raised from contributions by other individuals. An additional $166,000 came from other committees.

Friends of John Delaney quarterly financial summaries
Filing quarter or month	Cash on hand at beginning	Cash on hand at end	Receipts	Disbursements	Debts/loans owed by campaign	Debts/loans owed to campaign
2017 Q1	22,042.84	65,398.59	83,825.05	40,469.30	1,183,250.00	0.00
2017 Q2	65,398.59	54,024.96	187,588.60	198,962.23	1,243,250.00	0.00
2017 Q3	54,024.96	313,073.96	577,085.53	318,036.53	1,243,250.00	0.00
2017 Q4	313,073.96	379,442.19	647,299.54	580,931.31	1,743,250.00	0.00
2018 Q1	379,442.19	829,703.50	2,173,151.75	1,722,890.44	3,743,250.00	0.00
2018 Q2	829,703.50	154,256.50	240,167.48	915,614.48	3,743,250.00	0.00
2018 Q3	154,256.50	77,856.55	1,088,448.44	1,164,848.39	4,743,250.00	0.00
2018 Q4	77,856.55	268,248.08	1,148,213.05	957,821.52	5,743,250.00	0.00
2019 Q1	268,248.08	10,567,864.85	12,144,069.64	12,412,317.72	17,443,250.00	0.00
2019 Q2	10,567,864.85	7,442,612.67	8,039,926.90	11,165,179.08	16,193,250.00	0.00
2019 Q3	7,442,612.67	548,060.86	8,039,926.90	868,452.26	10,593,250.00	0.00
2019 Q4	548,060.86	139,881.24	1,406,514.85	1,814,694.47	11,408,250.00	0.00
Feb 2020	139,881.24	112,811.86	491,301.07	518,370.45	11,408,250.00	0.00
March 2020	112,811.86	14,811.07	224,636.53	322,637.32	11,408,250.00	0.00
April 2020	14,811.07	42,164.69	117,821.62	90,468.00	1,493,250.00	0.00
May 2020	42,164.69	36,507.15	207.14	5,864.68	1,493,250.00	0.00
June 2020	36,507.15	20,403.57	0.00	16,103.58	1,493,250.00	0.00
July 2020	20,403.57	15,344.97	0.00	50,58.60	1,493,250.00	0.00
August 2020	15,344.97	17,497.08	0.00	-2,152.11	1,493,250.00	0.00
September 2020	17,497.08	14,548.72	14,548.72	1,727.66	1,493,250.00	0.00
October 2020	30,318.14	24,698.52	0.00	5,619.62	1,493,250.00	0.00
November 2020	24,698.52	18,399.85	1,873.00	8,171.67	1,493,250.00	0.00
December 2020	18,399.85	16,196.58	338.93	2,542.20	1,493,250.00	0.00
Overall	22,042.84	16,196.58	29,455,470.10	29,465,486.40	1,493,250.00	0.00

== See also ==
- Democratic Party presidential primaries, 2020
- 2020 United States presidential election
