= Exploratory committee =

Organization in U.S. politics to determine whether someone should run for office

An exploratory committee is an organization established to help determine whether a potential candidate should run for an elected office in United States electoral politics. They are most often cited in reference to candidates for president of the United States prior to campaign announcements and the primaries. Exploratory committees allow prospective candidates to raise money and hire staff, and they do not have to report financial activity to the Federal Election Commission. Forming an exploratory committee for president almost always precedes an official candidacy, though some, such as Paul Wellstone in 2000 and Evan Bayh in 2008, have declined to formally run.

Exploratory committees may be governed by law. For example, the District of Columbia legally defines Exploratory Committees as (in DC Official Code § 1-1101.01(6)(B)(vi)):

Exploratory, draft or "testing the waters" committees are formed solely for the purpose of determining the feasibility of an individual’s candidacy for office. The activities of exploratory committees may include polling, travel, and telephone calls to determine whether the individual should become a candidate.

NPR reporter Ron Elving described the use of exploratory committees in his story, "Declaring for President is a Dance of Seven Veils," which aired on December 5, 2006. He wrote:

The exploratory committee has been around for decades, and technically it creates a legal shell for a candidate who expects to spend more than $5,000 while contemplating an actual run. Under the rules, exploratory money may be raised without the full disclosure of sources required of true candidates. Only when the candidate drops the exploratory label does the full responsibility of transparency apply.

Candidates use an exploratory committee as not only a transitional phase for their bookkeeping but as an extra claim on media attention. Some of the most skillful handlers like to leak word that their candidate is testing the waters, then leak word that they are thinking about forming an exploratory committee. Additional "news" can be made when the same candidate actually forms such a committee and registers with the Federal Election Commission. Yet a fourth round of attention may be generated when the word exploratory gets dropped from the committee filing.
