= Presidential campaign announcements in the United States =

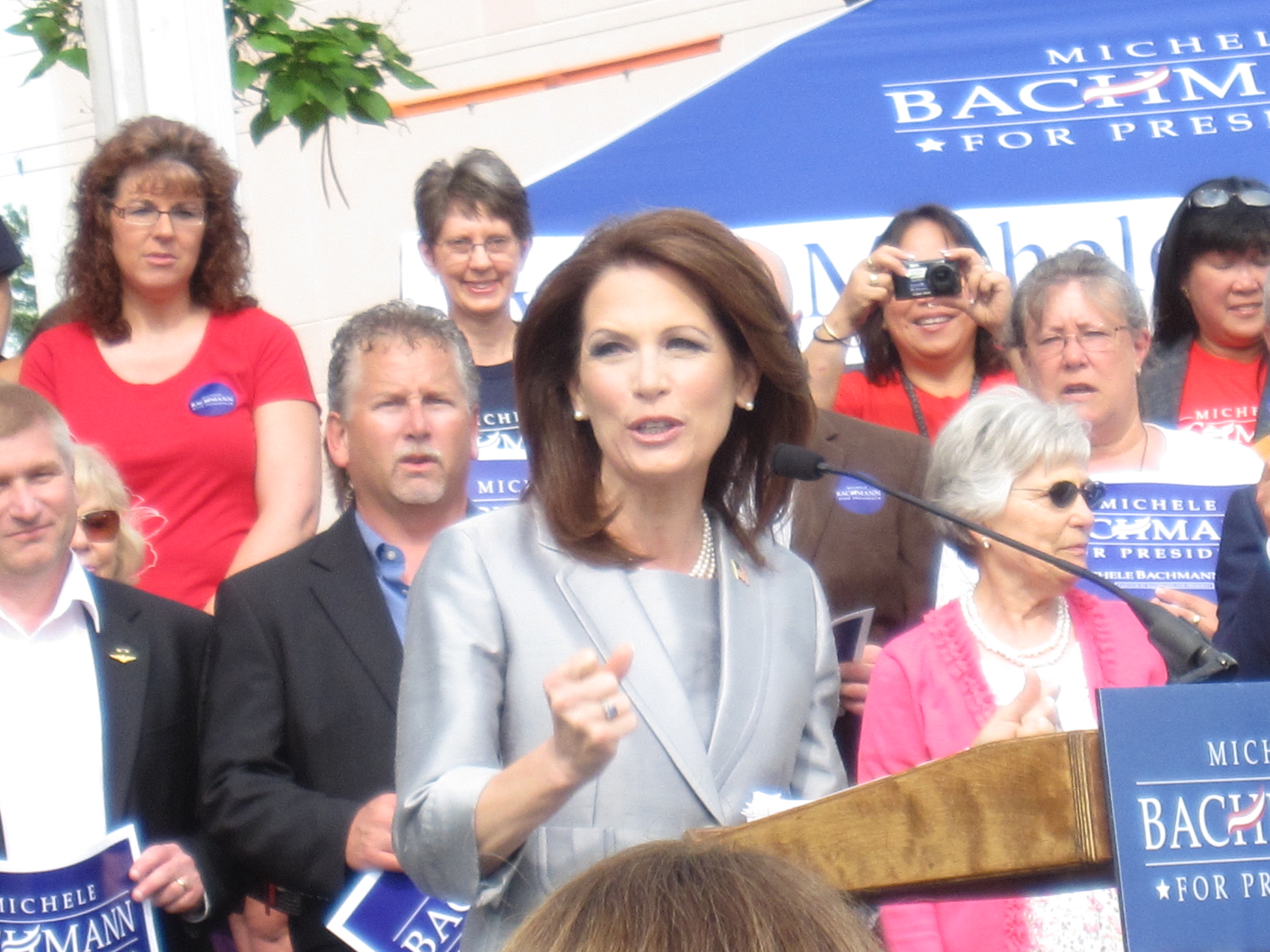
Michele Bachmann 2012 presidential campaign formal announcement on June 26, 2011

A campaign announcement is the formal public launch of a political campaign, often delivered in a speech by the candidate at a political rally.

Formal campaign announcements play an important role in United States presidential elections, particularly in shaping the start of a campaign season. They became more significant with the introduction of presidential primaries (as opposed to state caucuses) in the early 20th century. The expression to "throw one's hat in the ring", describing a challenger in boxing, was popularized by the Theodore Roosevelt 1912 presidential campaign. There has been a trend of announcements coming earlier, and even being preceded by an invisible primary phase and often as a first public step by an exploratory committee.

A pledge to not run, the opposite of a campaign announcement, is known as a Shermanesque statement.

== Factors ==
The timing of announcements has to balance aspects of first-mover advantage, name recognition, political momentum, and campaign fundraising for early or late entrants. Frontrunners generally have more reason to delay announcing. Financial rules from the Federal Elections Commission also disincentivize candidates from clearly stating their intentions early. Notable late outsider efforts include the Robert F. Kennedy 1968 presidential campaign and the Jesse Jackson 1984 presidential campaign.

Presidential announcements took new social media political forms in the 2012 and 2016 campaigns. The ambiguity of waiting for formal announcements for US elections in general has been criticized.

The Ross Perot 1992 presidential campaign had been de facto active as an independent campaign with a conditional announcement statement on Larry King Live (a talk show first), before the candidate withdrew, and then re-entered and formally announced only a month before the election.

Sometimes an announcement will be delayed until considerably after the primary campaign has been underway. Examples include the Hillary Clinton 2016 presidential campaign and the Pete Buttigieg 2020 presidential campaign.

In 2020, Congressman Justin Amash formed an exploratory committee but decided not to run as an Independent.

FiveThirtyEight reckons that the John Delaney 2020 presidential campaign announcement on July 28, 2017, is the earliest by a serious candidate for at least 45 years, with a total campaign time of 2 years, 6 months and 3 days.
