= Cornel West 2024 presidential campaign =

American political campaign

Cornel West for President
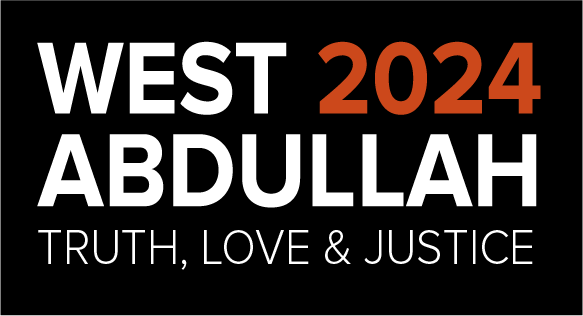
- Campaign: 2024 U.S. presidential election
- Candidate: Cornel West Author, civil rights activist, philosopher, and professor Melina Abdullah Author, civil rights activist, philosopher, and professor
- Affiliation: Justice for All Party; Aurora Party; Oregon Progressive Party; Green Party (formerly); People's Party (formerly)
- Status: Announced as People's Party: June 5, 2023; Announced as Green Party: June 14, 2023; Announced as Independent: October 5, 2023; Announced as Justice for All Party: January 31, 2024
- Key people: Peter Daou, campaign manager (former); Jill Stein, campaign advisor (former)
- Receipts: US$1,374,285.69 (November 25, 2024)

Website
- www.cornelwest2024.com

Cornel West, a philosopher, academic, and political activist, announced on June 5, 2023 that he was running for president in the 2024 US presidential election.

West started his campaign as a People's Party candidate. On June 14, 2023, West announced that he would instead seek the Green Party's presidential nomination. On October 5, 2023, West dropped out of the Green Party primaries and announced that he would instead run an independent campaign for president. On January 31, 2024, he created the "Justice for All Party". By August 2024, West had stopped actively campaigning for the presidency, and his campaign reported being $17,000 in debt. His candidacy was noted for the significant support it received from allies of Republican presidential nominee Donald Trump who wanted West to appear on swing state ballots to draw votes away from Democratic presidential nominee Kamala Harris.

On election day, West finished in seventh place in the presidential election popular vote. He received 82,644 votes, or 0.05% of the popular vote.

== Background ==
After serving as an advisor to Bill Bradley in 2000, West became a prominent and active supporter of Green Party nominee Ralph Nader, speaking at several Nader rallies. West backed Barack Obama in the 2008 Democratic primaries, but criticized him after he became president.

West backed Bernie Sanders in 2016, and after Hillary Clinton won the nomination, he endorsed Green Party nominee Jill Stein, despite being on the platform drafting committee of the Democratic National Committee.

== Campaign ==
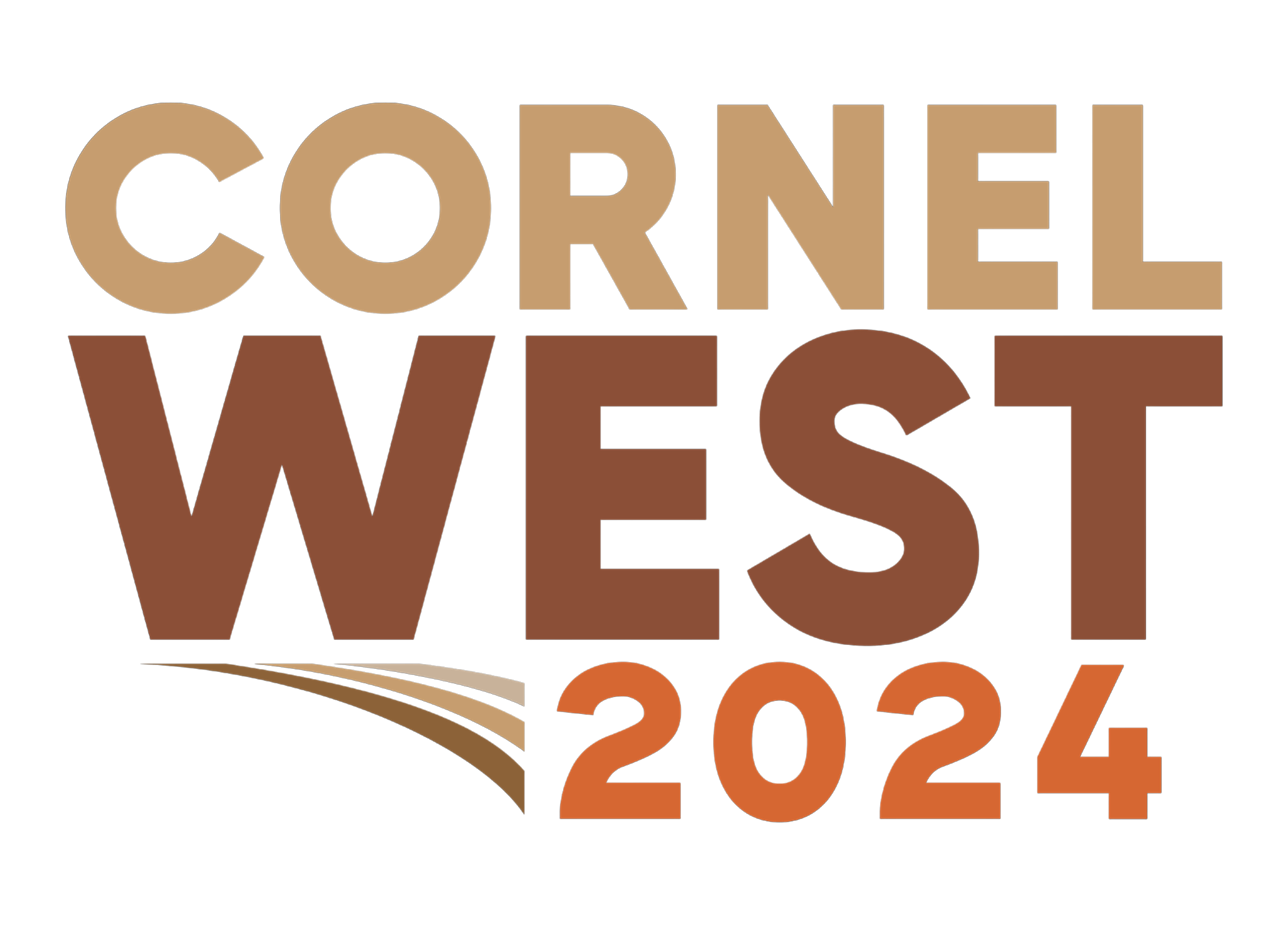
Initial campaign logo

On June 5, 2023, West announced that he would run for president in 2024.

=== People's Party ===
In his announcement video, West stated, "I have decided to run for truth and justice, which takes the form of running for president of the United States as a candidate for the People's Party. I enter for the quest for truth. I enter for the quest of justice. And the presidency is just one vehicle we pursue that truth and justice". He criticized both major political parties for failing to "tell the truth about Wall Street, about Ukraine, about the Pentagon, about Big Tech."

The People's Party immediately endorsed his campaign. In The Nation, Jeet Heer argued against West's choice of party, noting sexual assault allegations against party founder Nick Brana and issues relating to ballot access.

The founder of the party, Nick Brana, has been accused of sexual harassment and assault, and the party has ballot access only in Florida, with no track record of running campaigns. Ben Burgis (a columnist for Jacobin), Bhaskar Sunkara (the founding editor of Jacobin) and D. D. Guttenplan, (editor of The Nation) argued that he should run for the Democratic Party nomination instead, while Jeet Heer argued for the Green Party.

=== Green Party ===
On June 14, 2023, West announced he was running for the Green Party's 2024 presidential nomination.

West announced that Jill Stein, the Green Party's presidential nominee in 2012 and 2016, would be chairing his campaign.

On July 14, 2023, West stated that NATO had provoked the Russian invasion of Ukraine in a Twitter post. Later, West criticized Biden for authoring the 1994 crime bill, which Biden has publicly disavowed.

West responded to claims of being a spoiler candidate via a July 23 CNN interview with Anderson Cooper, saying:

There are tons of people, every two and four years who decide not to vote at all. And we know that the so called spoilers, which is a category I don't accept at all whether it be Gary Johnson, sister Jill Stein or Ralph Nader, many of those voters say they would never vote for the two parties at all. And I can understand, those politicians become too corrupt, too conformant, what about truth? What about justice? If you are concerned about truth and justice you cannot be complacent. Look at the world at the lens through those incarcerated, in the ghettos."

In July 2023, Reform and Revolution, a Marxist caucus of the Democratic Socialists of America, published opposing articles arguing for and against DSA supporting West's campaign, endorsing neither as an official caucus position.

On September 11, 2023, West brought on Peter Daou as his campaign manager; Daou had previously held that role for Marianne Williamson's campaign. Daou left the West campaign on October 27.

=== Switch to independent candidacy ===
On October 5, 2023, West announced he was withdrawing his candidacy for the Green Party nomination and would instead run as an independent, beginning the process for attaining ballot access.

West's campaign released a statement explaining his rationale for making the switch, stating that West "believes the best way to challenge the entrenched system is by focusing 100% on the people, not on the intricacies of internal party dynamics".

=== Announcing the Justice for All Party ===
On January 31, 2024, West announced via a video on X (formerly Twitter) that he was establishing a new party called "Justice for All". West said the party would start seeking ballot access in the states where it was the most expedient to attain it: Florida, North Carolina, and Washington. The campaign planned to get ballot access in the state of Florida through a nominating caucus.

=== Vice presidential selection ===
On April 10, 2024, West announced on The Tavis Smiley Show that he had chosen fellow academic Melina Abdullah as his vice presidential running mate.

== Ballot access ==
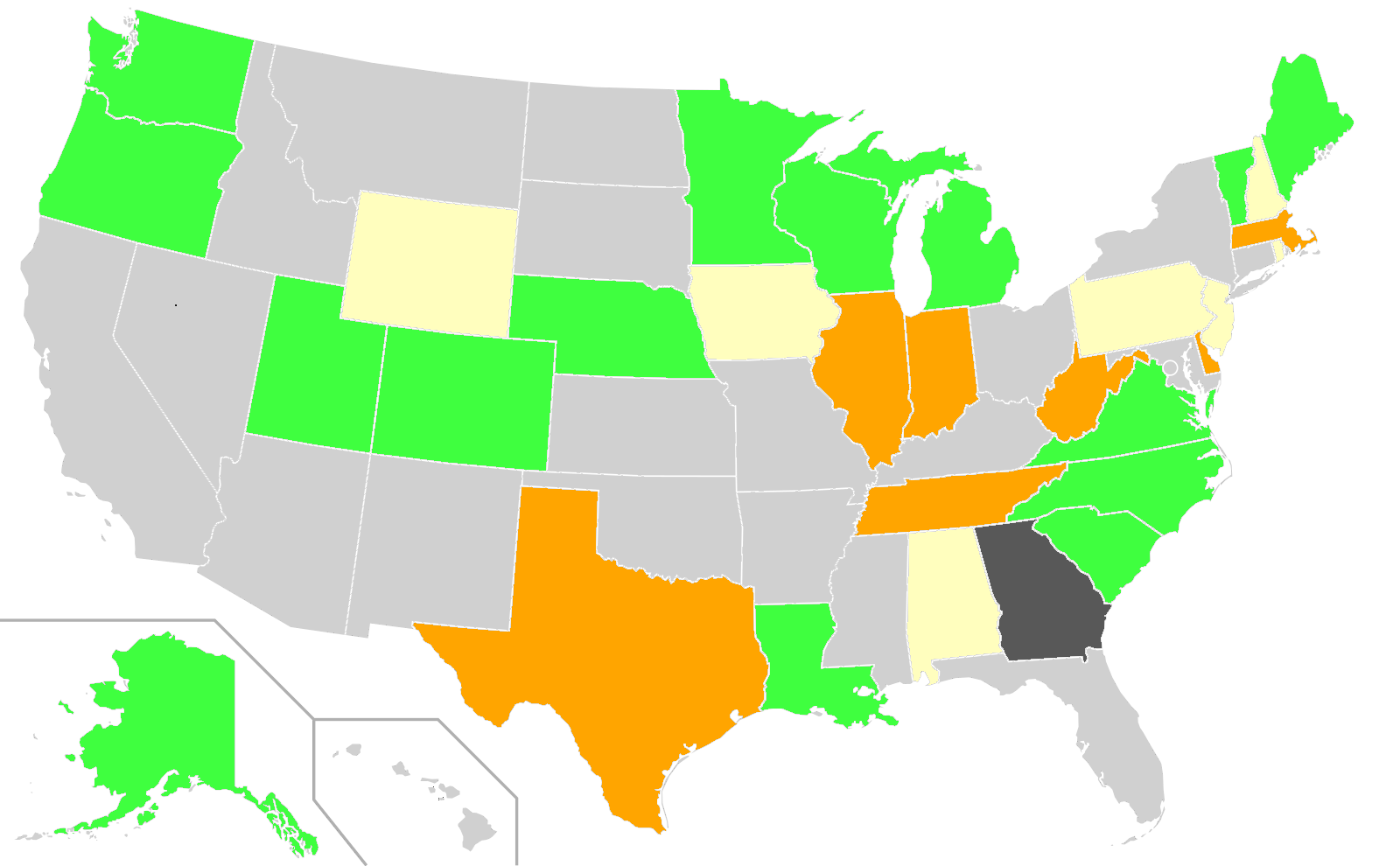
West ballot access for the 2024 presidential election, as of July 2024: Certified for ballot (15 states, 132 electors) (Note: West on the ballot in: Alaska (3, as Aurora Party); Colorado (10, as Unity Party); Louisiana (8, as Justice For All); Maine (4, as Justice For All); Michigan (15); Minnesota (10, as Justice For All); Nebraska (5, as Nebraska Legal Marijuana NOW Party); North Carolina (16, as Justice For All); Oregon (8, as Progressive Party); South Carolina (9, as United Citizens Party); Utah (6); Vermont (3, as Green Mountain Peace and Justice Party); Virginia (13); Washington (12, as Justice For All Party); Wisconsin (10, as Justice For All Party)) Registered write-in (13 states, 175 electors) (Note: West registered write-in in: Connecticut (7); Delaware (3); Illinois (19); Indiana (11); Kansas (6); Kentucky (8); Maryland (10); Massachusetts (11); New York (28); Ohio (17); Tennessee (11); Texas (40); West Virginia (4)) Automatic write-in (Seven states, 59 electors) (Note: West write-in states: Alabama (9); Iowa (6); New Hampshire (4); New Jersey (14); Pennsylvania (19); Rhode Island (4); Wyoming (3)) On ballot, votes did not count (One state, 16 electors) (Note: West disqualified states: Georgia (16)) Not on ballot

=== Arizona ===
In August 2024, the Arizona Secretary of State said that the campaign did not file sufficient paperwork to gain ballot access in the state before the set deadline. This was in spite of reported efforts from Republican lawyers to secure electors to support West's efforts.

=== Colorado ===
The Unity Party of America, a centrist third party, suffered a serious split over support of West. The party's national leadership, and the party's national convention, named Paul Noel Fiorino their nominee. However, the Colorado state affiliate, chaired by TJ Cole, held its own convention at which 95% of delegates supported West and 5% supported Fiorino, giving West the party's ballot line in Colorado, the only state where the party had ballot access. This would lead to a schism within the Unity Party, as the national chairman Bill Hammons denounced Cole, with Cole conversely stating that the National Party simply doesn't exist, and that there is no Unity Party outside of the Colorado state party.

=== Michigan ===
In August 2024, Cornel West and his running mate Melina Abdullah were both initially disqualified and denied entry onto the 2024 Michigan presidential election ballot, due to an incorrectly notarized form. The Michigan Secretary of State had given West's campaign a week to submit a response concerning the notarization issues and did not receive a response, after which the department disqualified West. On August 24, a Michigan judge overruled the decision, and required West to be given ballot access in Michigan.

=== Pennsylvania ===
In August of 2024, a judge ruled agreeing with the Secretary of State's office that West's candidacy paperwork was insufficient for ballot access in Pennsylvania.

=== Wisconsin ===
In Wisconsin, an employee of the Democratic National Convention challenged to keep West off of the ballot. In August 2024, the Wisconsin Election Commission rejected the challenge, and voted 5-1 to keep West on the ballot.

== Political positions ==
West supports Medicare for All, a Green New Deal, ending all new oil drilling, universal public housing, term limits in congress, ending US support for NATO, Ukraine, and Israel, and closing most US military bases.

== Support from Republicans ==
The Associated Press (AP) described "extensive" involvement from GOP lawyers and operatives to further West's bid for president. West expressed ambivalence about this support. Specifically, Republican-aligned groups, donors, and lawyers helped West to get on the ballot in several states, including Michigan, Georgia, Virginia, Nebraska, Maine, North Carolina, Arizona and Wisconsin. Although West had stopped actively campaigning by August 2024, registered Republicans signed up to be electors for West in swing states. The Democratic National Committee filed a complaint with the Federal Election Commission arguing that the unreported in-kind contributions that went towards signature gathering and lawyers in North Carolina and Arizona were illegal.

West's donors included Republican megadonor Harlan Crow, who some have theorized may have donated to the campaign in the hope that West would hurt Democrats' electoral chances. West defended Crow but ultimately returned the donation after public pushback.

=== Wisconsin ===
Four Republican employees of a canvassing firm that said it worked on behalf of "conservative political campaigns" collected signatures to put West on the ballot. The company's president, David Blair, worked in the Trump administration. Ultimately, all Democratic commissioners voted with two Republican commissioners to reject an attempt by the Democratic National Committee to remove West from the Wisconsin ballot on August 28, 2024.

=== Arizona ===
In Arizona, GOP lawyers and operatives signed up to be electors for West and tried to convince two electors to back West after one switched their support to Harris and another denied having ever agreed to be an elector. Eighty paid out-of-state canvassers were hired by a firm closely aligned with Republican operative Mark Jacoby, who has a reputation of deceptive tactics and a voter registration fraud conviction.

=== North Carolina ===
In April 2024, a Trump-aligned activist signed up attendees outside of a Trump rally in North Carolina, pitching the idea that West being on the ballot would help get Trump elected.

North Carolina's election board blocked West's party from appearing on the ballot after surveying 50 of the signatures to see if they signed the petition, and found that many did not sign it or did not know what it was for. A Republican canvassing firm submitted the signatures and it was unclear who paid for the signature gathering.

== Results ==
West received 82,644 total votes, or 0.05% of the popular vote. He received the seventh-most popular votes in the presidential contest.
