= 2020 Democratic Party presidential debates =

Debates took place among candidates in the campaign for the Democratic Party's nomination for the president of the United States in the 2020 presidential election.

There were a total of 29 major Democratic candidates. Of these, 23 candidates participated in at least one debate. Only Joe Biden and Bernie Sanders participated in all the debates; Pete Buttigieg, Amy Klobuchar, and Elizabeth Warren participated in all but the final debate.

== Overview ==
Sites of the eleven Democratic presidential debates.

=== Schedule ===
In December 2018, the Democratic National Committee (DNC) announced the schedule for 12 official DNC-sanctioned debates, set to begin in June 2019, with six debates in 2019 and the remaining six during the first four months of 2020. Candidates were allowed to participate in forums featuring multiple other candidates as long as only one candidate appeared on stage at a time. Any presidential candidates who participated in unsanctioned debates with each other would have lost their invitations to the next DNC-sanctioned debate. No unsanctioned debates took place during the 2019–2020 debate season.

The DNC also announced that it would not partner with Fox News as a media sponsor for any debates. Fox News last held a Democratic debate in 2003. All media sponsors selected to host a debate were as a new rule required to appoint at least one female moderator for each debate, to ensure there would not be a gender-skewed treatment of the candidates and debate topics.

Debate schedule
| Debate | Date | Time (ET) | Viewers | Location | Sponsor(s) | Moderator(s) |
|---|---|---|---|---|---|---|
| 1A | June 26, 2019 | 9–11 p.m. | ~24.3 million (15.3m live TV; 9m streaming) | Arsht Center, Miami, Florida | NBC News; MSNBC; Telemundo | José Díaz-Balart; Savannah Guthrie; Lester Holt; Rachel Maddow; Chuck Todd |
| 1B | June 27, 2019 | 9–11 p.m. | ~27.1 million (18.1m live TV; 9m streaming) | Arsht Center, Miami, Florida | NBC News; MSNBC; Telemundo | José Díaz-Balart; Savannah Guthrie; Lester Holt; Rachel Maddow; Chuck Todd |
| 2A | July 30, 2019 | 8–10:30 p.m. | ~11.5 million (8.7m live TV; 2.8m streaming) | Fox Theatre, Detroit, Michigan | CNN | Dana Bash; Don Lemon; Jake Tapper |
| 2B | July 31, 2019 | 8–10:30 p.m. | ~13.8 million (10.7m live TV; 3.1m streaming) | Fox Theatre, Detroit, Michigan | CNN | Dana Bash; Don Lemon; Jake Tapper |
| 3 | September 12, 2019 | 8–11 p.m. | 14.04 million live TV | Health and Physical Education Arena, Texas Southern University, Houston, Texas | ABC News; Univision | Linsey Davis; David Muir; Jorge Ramos; George Stephanopoulos |
| 4 | October 15, 2019 | 8–11 p.m. | ~8.8 million (8.34m live TV; 0.45m streaming) | Rike Physical Education Center, Otterbein University, Westerville, Ohio | CNN; The New York Times | Erin Burnett; Anderson Cooper; Marc Lacey |
| 5 | November 20, 2019 | 9–11 p.m. | ~7.9 million (6.6m live TV; 1.3m streaming) | Oprah Winfrey sound stage, Tyler Perry Studios, Atlanta, Georgia | MSNBC; The Washington Post | Rachel Maddow; Andrea Mitchell; Ashley Parker; Kristen Welker |
| 6 | December 19, 2019 | 8–11 p.m. | ~14.6 million (6.17m live TV; 8.4m streaming) | Gersten Pavilion, Loyola Marymount University, Los Angeles, California | PBS; Politico | Tim Alberta; Yamiche Alcindor; Amna Nawaz; Judy Woodruff |
| 7 | January 14, 2020 | 9–11:15 p.m. | ~11.3 million (7.3m live TV; 4.0m streaming) | Sheslow Auditorium, Drake University, Des Moines, Iowa | CNN; The Des Moines Register | Wolf Blitzer; Brianne Pfannenstiel; Abby Phillip |
| 8 | February 7, 2020 | 8–10:30 p.m. | ~11.0 million (7.8m live TV; 3.2m streaming) | Thomas F. Sullivan Arena, Saint Anselm College, Manchester, New Hampshire | ABC News; WMUR-TV; Apple News | Linsey Davis; Monica Hernandez; David Muir; Adam Sexton; George Stephanopoulos |
| 9 | February 19, 2020 | 9–11 p.m. | ~33.16 million (19.66m live TV; 13.5m streaming) | Le Théâtre des Arts, Paris Las Vegas, Paradise, Nevada | NBC News; MSNBC; Telemundo; The Nevada Independent | Vanessa Hauc; Lester Holt; Hallie Jackson; Jon Ralston; Chuck Todd |
| 10 | February 25, 2020 | 8–10 p.m. | ~30.4 million (15.3m live TV; 15.1m streaming) | Gaillard Center, Charleston, South Carolina | CBS News; BET; Twitter; Congressional Black Caucus Institute | Margaret Brennan; Major Garrett; Gayle King; Norah O'Donnell; Bill Whitaker |
| 11 | March 15, 2020 | 8–10 p.m. | ~11.4 million (10.8m live TV; 0.6m streaming) | CNN studio Washington, D.C. | CNN; Univision; Congressional Hispanic Caucus BOLD | Dana Bash; Ilia Calderón; Jake Tapper |

=== Participation ===
The following is a table of participating candidates in each debate:

Participating candidates in the DNC-sanctioned debates
Candidate
| Candidate | P Present A Absent I Invited N Not invited Out Not yet entered race W Withdrawn | | | | | | | | | | |
| Candidate | 1 | 2 | 3 | 4 | 5 | 6 | 7 | 8 | 9 | 10 | 11 |
|---|---|---|---|---|---|---|---|---|---|---|---|
| Joe Biden | P | P | P | P | P | P | P | P | P | P | P |
| Bernie Sanders | P | P | P | P | P | P | P | P | P | P | P |
| Tulsi Gabbard | P | P | N | P | P | N | N | N | N | N | N |
| Elizabeth Warren | P | P | P | P | P | P | P | P | P | P | W |
| Michael Bloomberg | Out | | | | | N | N | N | P | P | W |
| Amy Klobuchar | P | P | P | P | P | P | P | P | P | P | W |
| Pete Buttigieg | P | P | P | P | P | P | P | P | P | P | W |
| Tom Steyer | Out | N | N | P | P | P | P | P | N | P | W |
| Deval Patrick | Out | | | | | N | N | N | W | | |
| Michael Bennet | P | P | N | N | N | N | N | N | W | | |
| Andrew Yang | P | P | P | P | P | P | N | P | W | | |
| John Delaney | P | P | N | N | N | N | N | W | | | |
| Cory Booker | P | P | P | P | P | N | N | W | | | |
| Marianne Williamson | P | P | N | N | N | N | W | | | | |
| Julián Castro | P | P | P | P | N | N | W | | | | |
| Kamala Harris | P | P | P | P | P | W | | | | | |
| Steve Bullock | N | P | N | N | N | W | | | | | |
| Joe Sestak | Out | N | N | N | N | W | | | | | |
| Wayne Messam | N | N | N | N | N | W | | | | | |
| Beto O'Rourke | P | P | P | P | W | | | | | | |
| Tim Ryan | P | P | N | N | W | | | | | | |
| Bill de Blasio | P | P | N | W | | | | | | | |
| Kirsten Gillibrand | P | P | W | | | | | | | | |
| Seth Moulton | N | N | W | | | | | | | | |
| Jay Inslee | P | P | W | | | | | | | | |
| John Hickenlooper | P | P | W | | | | | | | | |
| Mike Gravel | N | N | W | | | | | | | | |
| Eric Swalwell | P | W | | | | | | | | | |
| Richard Ojeda | W | | | | | | | | | | |

== Debates in 2019 ==
=== First debates (June 26–27, 2019) ===
==== Qualification ====
To qualify for the first debates, entrants had to, at a minimum, achieve one of the two criteria listed. If this had resulted in more than 20 qualified candidates, the two criteria would have been evaluated in combination per an outlined set of tiebreaking rules, but since 20 candidates qualified, no tiebreaker was necessary. The deadline for candidates to meet either of the below criteria was June 12.

Qualification requirements for the first debate
| Polling criterion | Attain at least 1% support in a minimum of 3 approved polls at a national level or in the first four primary/caucus states (Iowa, New Hampshire, Nevada, and South Carolina). The polling threshold was determined using only the published top-line result (whether or not it was a rounded or weighted number) of polls published between January 1, 2019, and June 12, 2019, with each candidate only having been able to count one poll by the same pollster within each region towards the requirement. For a poll to be considered it must not have been based on open-ended questions, and also needed to have been commissioned or conducted by a limited set of organizations: the Associated Press, ABC News, CBS News, CNN, The Des Moines Register, Fox News, the Las Vegas Review-Journal, Monmouth University, National Public Radio, NBC News, The New York Times, Quinnipiac University, Reuters, the University of New Hampshire, USA Today, The Wall Street Journal, The Washington Post, and Winthrop University. |
| Fundraising criterion | Meet a fundraising threshold, in which a candidate must have received donations from a minimum of 65,000 unique donors, with at least 200 unique donors per state in at least 20 states. Candidates who wished to qualify using the fundraising threshold must have presented evidence to the DNC of their eligibility using donor data collected by ActBlue or NGP VAN. |

Qualified candidates for the first debate (as of June 12)
| Candidate | Met donor criterion (3rd tiebreak priority) | Met polling criterion (2nd tiebreak priority) | Met both criteria (1st tiebreak priority) | Additional Ref(s) |
| Biden | Yes (on April 26) | Yes (37.7%, 10 qualifying polls) | Yes | |
| Sanders | Yes (before April 1) | Yes (26.7%, 10 qualifying polls) | Yes | |
| Warren | Yes (before April 1) | Yes (16.3%, 10 qualifying polls) | Yes | |
| Buttigieg | Yes (before April 1) | Yes (13%, 10 qualifying polls) | Yes | |
| Harris | Yes (before April 1) | Yes (11%, 10 qualifying polls) | Yes | |
| O'Rourke | Yes (on March 15) | Yes (10.3%, 10 qualifying polls) | Yes | |
| Booker | Yes (on May 4) | Yes (4.0%, 10 qualifying polls) | Yes | |
| Klobuchar | Yes (before April 1) | Yes (3.7%, 10 qualifying polls) | Yes | |
| Castro | Yes (on May 3) | Yes (2.0%, 8 qualifying polls) | Yes | |
| Yang | Yes (on March 11) | Yes (1.7%, 10 qualifying polls) | Yes | |
| Gabbard | Yes (on April 11) | Yes (1.3%, 8 qualifying polls) | Yes | |
| Gillibrand | Yes (on June 10) | Yes (1.3%, 6 qualifying polls) | Yes | |
| Inslee | Yes (on May 24) | Yes (1.0%, 5 qualifying polls) | Yes | |
| Williamson | Yes (on May 9) | Yes (1.0%, 4 qualifying polls) | Yes | |
| Ryan | No | Yes (1.3%, 7 qualifying polls) | No | |
| Hickenlooper | No | Yes (1.3%, 5 qualifying polls) | No | |
| Bennet | No | Yes (1.0%, 3 qualifying polls) | No | |
| de Blasio | No | Yes (1.0%, 3 qualifying polls) | No | |
| Delaney | No | Yes (1.0%, 3 qualifying polls) | No | |
| Swalwell | No | Yes (1.0%, 3 qualifying polls) | No | |
| Bullock | No | No (2 qualifying polls) | No | |
| Messam | No | No (1 qualifying poll) | No | |
| Gravel | No (40,000 donors on June 1) | No (0 qualifying polls) | No | |
| Moulton | No | No (0 qualifying polls) | No | |
| Ojeda | No | No (0 qualifying polls) | No | |
Withdrawn candidate

==== Summary ====
Democratic Party debates

First Democratic debates
- Host: NBC and MSNBC
- Date(s): June 26, 2019; June 27, 2019
- Venue: Arsht Center
- Location: Miami, Florida
- Lead moderator: Savannah Guthrie
- Other moderators: Lester Holt; Chuck Todd; Rachel Maddow; José Díaz-Balart

External videos
- NBC News / MSNBC; Democratic Debate, Miami, Florida, June 26, 2019; June 27, 2019
- June 26 Live Stream Recording, NBC News via YouTube
- June 27 Live Stream Recording, NBC News via YouTube

The Democratic Party's first presidential debates ahead of the 2020 U.S. presidential election were held in two groups on June 26 and 27, 2019, in Miami, Florida.

Starting at 8:00 p.m. Eastern Standard Time, they aired on NBC and were broadcast on radio by Westwood One. Savannah Guthrie was the lead moderator of the debates, joined by Lester Holt, Chuck Todd, Rachel Maddow, and José Díaz-Balart.

The DNC drew lots among the 20 qualified candidates for the first debate to determine whether they should debate on the first night (June 26) or second night (June 27) at the NBC News headquarters (30 Rockefeller Plaza) in New York City on June 14. The qualified candidates or their representatives were present and involved at the drawing event, which was not televised.

The debates took place at the Arsht Center in Miami, Florida. The first night of the debate was marked by a noted dust-up between O'Rourke and Castro on the subject of immigration, which Castro was widely perceived to have won, while Warren met expectations as a top-tier candidate. In addition, Booker and Klobuchar each had their moment in the spotlight, Klobuchar in particular being noted for her one-liners, one of which was about acknowledging that, for the first time in U.S. history, there were at least three women on stage at a presidential debate. Gabbard took on Ryan over continuing the US presence in Afghanistan. Booker, Castro, and O'Rourke all spoke Spanish at different times during the debate, which received mixed reception and was met with jokes from second-night competitors Williamson and Yang on Twitter. On night two, Harris and Biden clashed over Biden's past comments about working with segregationist senators and his stance on desegregation busing. The second night was also notable for the performance of Williamson, who received significant attention for comments she made during the debate perceived as strange, including a reference to the Prime Minister of New Zealand Jacinda Ardern.

Before these debates, no major party had ever seen more than one female candidate on a presidential debate stage.

Night one candidates
| Candidates drawn for the June 26 debate | Drawing tier (Note: The drawing of lots happened from two tier groups (with the top tier comprising all qualified candidates with a polling average of over 2%, and the other tier comprising the rest), so that each tier was evenly split between each of the two debate nights.) | Polling criterion result | Airtime (min.) |
| Warren | 1 | 16.3% (10 polls) | 9.3 |
| O'Rourke | 1 | 10.3% (10 polls) | 10.3 |
| Booker | 1 | 4.0% (10 polls) | 10.9 |
| Klobuchar | 1 | 3.7% (10 polls) | 8.5 |
| Castro | 1 | 2.0% (8 polls) | 8.8 |
| Gabbard | 2 | 1.3% (8 polls) | 6.6 |
| Ryan | 2 | 1.3% (9 polls) | 7.7 |
| Inslee | 2 | 1% (7 polls) | 5.0 |
| de Blasio | 2 | 1% (3 polls) | 5.6 |
| Delaney | 2 | 1% (3 polls) | 6.6 |
| Average | | 4.2% | 7.9 |

Night two candidates
| Candidates drawn for the June 27 debate | Drawing tier | Polling criterion result | Airtime (min.) |
| Biden | 1 | 37.7% (10 polls) | 13.6 |
| Sanders | 1 | 26.7% (10 polls) | 11.0 |
| Buttigieg | 1 | 13% (10 polls) | 10.5 |
| Harris | 1 | 11% (10 polls) | 11.9 |
| Yang | 2 | 1.7% (10 polls) | 3.0 |
| Gillibrand | 2 | 1.3% (6 polls) | 7.5 |
| Hickenlooper | 2 | 1.3% (5 polls) | 5.2 |
| Bennet | 2 | 1% (3 polls) | 8.1 |
| Williamson | 2 | 1%, (4 polls) | 5.0 |
| Swalwell | 2 | 1% (3 polls) | 4.3 |
| Average | | 9.6% | 8.0 |

=== Second debates (July 30–31, 2019) ===
==== Qualification ====
The criteria for qualifying for the second debates were the same as for the first debates. To qualify for the second debates, debate entrants had to, at minimum, comply with one of the two below listed criteria. Mike Gravel was not invited to the debates since he only met the donor threshold, which was given a lesser weight than the polling threshold. The deadline for candidates to meet either of the below criteria was July 16.

Qualification requirements for the second debate
| Polling criterion | Attain at least 1% support in a minimum of 3 approved polls at a national level or in the first four primary/caucus states (Iowa, New Hampshire, Nevada, and South Carolina). The polling threshold was determined using only the published top-line result (whether or not it was a rounded or weighted number) of polls published between January 1, 2019, and July 16, 2019, with each candidate having only been able to count one poll by the same pollster within each region towards the requirement. For a poll to be considered it must not have been based on open-ended questions, and also needed to have been commissioned or conducted by a limited set of organizations: the Associated Press, ABC News, CBS News, CNN, The Des Moines Register, Fox News, the Las Vegas Review-Journal, Monmouth University, National Public Radio, NBC News, The New York Times, Quinnipiac University, Reuters, the University of New Hampshire, USA Today, The Wall Street Journal, The Washington Post, and Winthrop University. |
| Fundraising criterion | Meet a fundraising threshold, in which a candidate must have received donations from a minimum of 65,000 unique donors, with at least 200 unique donors per state in at least 20 states. Candidates who wished to qualify using the fundraising threshold must have presented evidence to the DNC of their eligibility using donor data collected by ActBlue or NGP VAN. |
| Tiebreaking rules (limiting the number of qualified candidates to 20) | 1. Candidates meeting both criteria had primacy over those who only met one criterion. Had more than 20 candidates met both criteria, only the top 20 candidates with the highest polling averages would have been invited. The polling averages for candidates was calculated as the average of their three best results in any qualifying polls, rounded to the nearest tenth. Had multiple candidates still been tied for the 20th spot in the debates, the candidates would have been further ranked by the number of approved polls in which each candidate received at least 1% support. The percentages used would have been the "top-line number listed in the original public release from the approved sponsoring organization/institution, whether or not it is a rounded or weighted number".; 2. If more than 20 candidates qualified by either criterion but fewer than 20 candidates qualified on the basis of both criteria and more than 20 met the polling criterion, then: All candidates who met both criteria would have been invited, with the rest of the available slots awarded to the remaining candidates who only met the polling criterion, with priority given to those with the highest polling averages – and in case of equal polling averages they would have been further ranked by the number of approved polls in which each candidate received at least 1% support (as calculated per the method described under rule 1).; 3. If more than 20 candidates qualified by either criterion but fewer than 20 candidates qualified on the basis of both criteria and fewer than 20 met the polling criterion, then: All candidates who met both criteria and all candidates who only met the polling criterion would have been invited, with the rest of the available slots awarded to the remaining candidates who only met the fundraising criterion, with priority given to those with the highest number of unique donors. |

Qualified candidates for the second debate (as of July 12)
| Candidate | Met donor criterion (3rd tiebreak priority) | Met polling criterion (2nd tiebreak priority) | Met both criteria (1st tiebreak priority) | Additional Ref(s) |
| Biden | Yes (on April 26) | Yes (40.7%, 19 qualifying polls) | Yes | |
| Sanders | Yes (before April 1) | Yes (26.7%, 19 qualifying polls) | Yes | |
| Warren | Yes (before April 1) | Yes (19%, 19 qualifying polls) | Yes | |
| Harris | Yes (before April 1) | Yes (17.7%, 19 qualifying polls) | Yes | |
| Buttigieg | Yes (before April 1) | Yes (13.3%, 19 qualifying polls) | Yes | |
| O'Rourke | Yes (on March 15) | Yes (10.3%, 18 qualifying polls) | Yes | |
| Booker | Yes (on May 4) | Yes (4.3%, 19 qualifying polls) | Yes | |
| Klobuchar | Yes (before April 1) | Yes (4.0%, 16 qualifying polls) | Yes | |
| Castro | Yes (on May 3) | Yes (2.7%, 12 qualifying polls) | Yes | |
| Yang | Yes (on March 11) | Yes (2.0%, 18 qualifying polls) | Yes | |
| Gabbard | Yes (on April 11) | Yes (1.3%, 12 qualifying polls) | Yes | |
| Gillibrand | Yes (on June 10) | Yes (1.3%, 10 qualifying polls) | Yes | |
| Inslee | Yes (on May 24) | Yes (1.0%, 9 qualifying polls) | Yes | |
| Williamson | Yes (on May 9) | Yes (1.0%, 8 qualifying polls) | Yes | |
| Hickenlooper | No | Yes (1.3%, 9 qualifying polls) | No | |
| Ryan | No | Yes (1.3%, 9 qualifying polls) | No | |
| Delaney | No | Yes (1.3%, 8 qualifying polls) | No | |
| Bennet | No | Yes (1.0%, 7 qualifying polls) | No | |
| Bullock | No | Yes (1.0%, 4 qualifying polls) | No | |
| de Blasio | No | Yes (1.0%, 4 qualifying polls) | No | |
| Gravel | Yes (on July 12) | No (1 qualifying poll) | No | |
| Messam | No | No (2 qualifying polls) | No | |
| Moulton | No | No (0 qualifying polls) | No | |
| Sestak | No | No (0 qualifying polls) | No | |
| Steyer | No | No (0 qualifying polls) | No | |
| Swalwell | No | Yes (1.0%, 3 qualifying polls) | No | |
Withdrawn candidate

==== Summary ====
Democratic Party debates

Second Democratic debates
- Host: CNN
- Date(s): July 30, 2019; July 31, 2019
- Venue: Fox Theatre
- Location: Detroit, Michigan
- Lead moderator: Jake Tapper
- Other moderators: Dana Bash; Don Lemon

The Democratic Party's second presidential debates ahead of the 2020 U.S. presidential election were held on July 30 and 31, 2019, in Detroit, Michigan.

Starting at 8:00 p.m. Eastern Standard Time, they aired on CNN and were broadcast on radio by Westwood One. Jake Tapper was the lead moderator of the debates, joined by Dana Bash and Don Lemon.

The drawing of lots among the 20 invited candidates to determine when they will debate was televised in prime time on July 18. There were three tiers of candidates that were split between two nights, as opposed to the two tiers used in the first debates.

In total, 21 candidates qualified for the second debate. The 14 candidates who met both criteria (Biden, Sanders, Warren, Harris, Buttigieg, O'Rourke, Booker, Klobuchar, Castro, Yang, Gabbard, Gillibrand, Inslee, and Williamson) and the six candidates who met the polling criterion only (Ryan, Hickenlooper, Delaney, de Blasio, Bennet, and Bullock) were invited to participate in the debate. Gravel, the one candidate to qualify by the donor criterion only, was not invited because of the 20-candidate limit and the polling criterion's precedence over the donor criterion as mandated by the DNC. The set of participants for the second debate was identical to the first debates with one exception: Bullock replaced Swalwell, who suspended his campaign between the first and second debates.

The debate on July 30 featured Bullock, Buttigieg, Delaney, Hickenlooper, Klobuchar, O'Rourke, Ryan, Sanders, Warren and Williamson, while the debate on July 31 featured Bennet, Biden, Booker, Castro, de Blasio, Gabbard, Gillibrand, Harris, Inslee and Yang. Both debates took place at the Fox Theatre in Detroit, Michigan.

The overarching theme on the first night was a clash between moderates and progressives on a variety of issues, ranging from Medicare for All to electability. CNN received criticism for allegedly inciting conflicts between candidates and making questions from Republican talking points, as well as enforcing the time limits too strictly. The second night saw significant discussion centered on candidates' differing health care plans. Additionally, Gabbard went on the offensive against Harris.

Night one candidates
| Candidates drawn for the July 30 debate | Drawing tier (Note: The drawing of lots happened from three tier groups (with the top tier comprising all qualified candidates with a polling average of over 15%), so that each tier was evenly split between each of the two debate nights.) | Polling criterion result | Airtime (min.) |
| Sanders | 1 | 27% (19 polls) | 17.6 |
| Warren | 1 | 19% (19 polls) | 17.9 |
| Buttigieg | 2 | 13.3% (19 polls) | 14.4 |
| O'Rourke | 2 | 10.3% (18 polls) | 10.9 |
| Klobuchar | 2 | 4% (16 polls) | 10.7 |
| Hickenlooper | 3 | 1.3% (9 polls) | 8.8 |
| Ryan | 3 | 1.3% (9 polls) | 9.8 |
| Delaney | 3 | 1.3% (8 polls) | 10.3 |
| Williamson | 3 | 1% (8 polls) | 8.9 |
| Bullock | 3 | 1% (4 polls) | 10.8 |
| Average | | 8% | 12.0 |

Night two candidates
| Candidates drawn for the July 31 debate | Drawing tier | Polling criterion result | Airtime (min.) |
| Biden | 1 | 40.7% (19 polls) | 21.2 |
| Harris | 1 | 17.7% (19 polls) | 17.7 |
| Booker | 2 | 4.3% (19 polls) | 12.8 |
| Castro | 2 | 2.7% (12 polls) | 10.5 |
| Yang | 2 | 2% (18 polls) | 8.7 |
| Gabbard | 3 | 1.3% (12 polls) | 10.6 |
| Gillibrand | 3 | 1.3% (10 polls) | 11.6 |
| Inslee | 3 | 1% (9 polls) | 10.7 |
| Bennet | 3 | 1% (7 polls) | 10.6 |
| de Blasio | 3 | 1% (4 polls) | 9.7 |
| Average | | 7.3% | 12.4 |

==== Participation ====
Each of the first two debates took place during two consecutive nights, with a maximum of 10 candidates per night. The DNC, at a public event before each debate, drew lots among the qualified candidates to determine whether they shall debate on the first or second night. This drawing procedure was designed to avoid the appearance of a "kiddie table" debate where the lowest polling candidates were grouped together with no leading candidates, which happened during the 2016 Republican Party presidential debates.

=== Third debate (September 12, 2019) ===
==== Qualification ====
The third debate took place at the Health and Physical Education Arena on the campus of Texas Southern University in Houston, Texas. For participation in the third debate, candidates were required to meet both polling and fundraising criteria by August 28 (in comparison to the first and second debates, where only one criterion was necessary). Qualifying polls had to be released between June 28 and August 28. Five candidates (Gravel, Hickenlooper, Inslee, Moulton, and Gillibrand) suspended their campaigns between the second and third debates.

On August 23, the Gabbard campaign criticized the DNC's purported lack of transparency in the process of selecting organizations/institutions to sponsor polls and how better-ranked polls were excluded. The campaign also highlighted the stark reduction in poll frequency, especially in early primary states, after the second debate compared to after the first debate and how they believed that that was "particularly harmful" to candidates with lower name recognition. The campaigns of Marianne Williamson, Tom Steyer, and Michael Bennet also requested that the DNC increase the number of certified polls by expanding the list of certified poll sponsoring organizations.

Qualification requirements for the third debate
| Polling criterion | A candidate needed to get at least two percent support in four different polls published from a list of approved pollsters between June 28 and August 28, which cannot be based on open-ended questions and may cover either the national level or one of the first four primary/caucus states (Iowa, New Hampshire, Nevada, and South Carolina). Only one poll from each approved pollster counted towards meeting the criterion in each region. The approved pollsters were the Associated Press, ABC News, CBS News, CNN, The Des Moines Register, Fox News, Monmouth University, National Public Radio, NBC News, The New York Times, Quinnipiac University, the University of New Hampshire, USA Today, The Wall Street Journal, The Washington Post, and Winthrop University. In contrast to the first two debates, polls published/sponsored by the Las Vegas Review-Journal and Reuters no longer counted towards meeting the criterion. |
| Fundraising criterion | Before the deadline, 11:59 p.m. on August 28, a candidate needed to receive financial support from a minimum of 130,000 unique donors, with at least 400 unique donors per state in at least 20 states. |

Qualified candidates for the third debate
| Candidate | Met donor criterion | Met polling criterion (as of August 28) | Met both criteria | Additional Ref(s) |
| Biden | Yes (before June 18) | Yes (15 qualifying polls) | Yes | |
| Buttigieg | Yes (before June 14) | Yes (15 qualifying polls) | Yes | |
| Harris | Yes (before June 14) | Yes (15 qualifying polls) | Yes | |
| Sanders | Yes (before June 14) | Yes (15 qualifying polls) | Yes | |
| Warren | Yes (before June 14) | Yes (15 qualifying polls) | Yes | |
| Booker | Yes (on July 29) | Yes (12 qualifying polls) | Yes | |
| O'Rourke | Yes (before June 17) | Yes (10 qualifying polls) | Yes | |
| Klobuchar | Yes (on August 2) | Yes (6 qualifying polls) | Yes | |
| Yang | Yes (on June 28) | Yes (6 qualifying polls) | Yes | |
| Castro | Yes (on July 8) | Yes (5 qualifying polls) | Yes | |
| Steyer | Yes (on August 13) | No (3 qualifying polls) | No | |
| Gabbard | Yes (on August 2) | No (2 qualifying polls) | No | |
| Williamson | Yes (on August 20) | No (1 qualifying poll) | No | |
| Bennet | No | No (0 qualifying polls) | No | |
| Bullock | No | No (0 qualifying polls) | No | |
| de Blasio | No | No (0 qualifying polls) | No | |
| Delaney | No | No (0 qualifying polls) | No | |
| Messam | No | No (0 qualifying polls) | No | |
| Ryan | No | No (0 qualifying polls) | No | |
| Sestak | No | No (0 qualifying polls) | No | |
| Inslee | Yes (on August 19) | No (0 qualifying polls) | No | |
| Gillibrand | No | No (1 qualifying poll) | No | |
| Hickenlooper | No | No (1 qualifying poll) | No | |
| Gravel | No | No (0 qualifying polls) | No | |
| Moulton | No | No (0 qualifying polls) | No | |
Withdrawn candidate

==== Summary ====
Democratic Party debates

Third Democratic debate
- Host: ABC News; Univision
- Date(s): September 12, 2019
- Venue: Health & Physical Education Arena; Texas Southern University
- Location: Houston, Texas
- Lead moderator: George Stephanopoulos
- Other moderators: David Muir; Linsey Davis; Jorge Ramos

External videos
- ABC News/Univision Democratic Debate, Houston, Texas, September 12, 2019
- Live Stream Recording, ABC News via YouTube
- Live Stream Recording, Univision via YouTube

The Democratic Party's third presidential debate ahead of the 2020 U.S. presidential election took place on September 12, 2019, in Houston, Texas.

It aired on ABC News and Univision. George Stephanopoulos was the lead moderator of the debate, joined by David Muir, Linsey Davis, and Jorge Ramos.

The candidates who qualified for the third debate were Biden, Booker, Buttigieg, Castro, Harris, Klobuchar, O'Rourke, Sanders, Warren, and Yang.

| Candidates | Airtime (min.) |
|---|---|
| Biden | 17.4 |
| Warren | 16.5 |
| Booker | 14.7 |
| Sanders | 14.1 |
| Harris | 13.7 |
| Buttigieg | 11.4 |
| Castro | 11.0 |
| Klobuchar | 10.4 |
| O'Rourke | 9.3 |
| Yang | 7.9 |
| Average | 12.6 |

=== Fourth debate (October 15, 2019) ===
==== Qualification ====
A memo released by the DNC on August 5 indicated that the qualification period for the fourth debate in October started on June 28, which was the same day that qualification began for the third debate (in effect allowing all candidates who qualified for the third debate to automatically qualify for the fourth debate). This gave candidates who did not qualify for the September debate more time to qualify for the October debate. Biden, Booker, Buttigieg, Castro, Harris, Klobuchar, O'Rourke, Sanders, Warren, and Yang qualified before August 22, while Steyer and Gabbard qualified on September 8 and September 24 respectively. The qualification deadline for the fourth debate was October 1, 2019. One candidate (de Blasio) suspended his campaign between the third and fourth debates.

Qualification requirements for the fourth debate
| Polling criterion | A candidate needed to get at least two percent support in four different polls published from a list of approved pollsters between June 28 and October 1, which cannot be based on open-ended questions and may cover either the national level or one of the first four primary/caucus states (Iowa, New Hampshire, Nevada, and South Carolina). Only one poll from each approved pollster counted towards meeting the criterion in each region. The approved pollsters were the Associated Press, ABC News, CBS News, CNN, The Des Moines Register, Fox News, Monmouth University, National Public Radio, NBC News, The New York Times, Quinnipiac University, the University of New Hampshire, USA Today, The Wall Street Journal, The Washington Post, and Winthrop University. |
| Fundraising criterion | Before the deadline, 11:59 p.m. on October 1, a candidate needed to receive financial support from a minimum of 130,000 unique donors, with at least 400 unique donors per state in at least 20 states. |

Qualified candidates for the fourth debate
| Candidate | Met donor criterion | Met polling criterion (as of October 1) | Met both criteria | Additional Ref(s) |
| Biden | Yes (before June 18) | Yes (22 qualifying polls) | Yes | |
| Buttigieg | Yes (before June 14) | Yes (22 qualifying polls) | Yes | |
| Harris | Yes (before June 14) | Yes (22 qualifying polls) | Yes | |
| Sanders | Yes (before June 14) | Yes (22 qualifying polls) | Yes | |
| Warren | Yes (before June 14) | Yes (22 qualifying polls) | Yes | |
| Booker | Yes (on July 29) | Yes (19 qualifying polls) | Yes | |
| O'Rourke | Yes (before June 17) | Yes (15 qualifying polls) | Yes | |
| Yang | Yes (on June 28) | Yes (13 qualifying polls) | Yes | |
| Klobuchar | Yes (on August 2) | Yes (10 qualifying polls) | Yes | |
| Steyer | Yes (on August 13) | Yes (10 qualifying polls) | Yes | |
| Castro | Yes (on July 8) | Yes (7 qualifying polls) | Yes | |
| Gabbard | Yes (on August 2) | Yes (4 or 5 qualifying polls) | Yes | |
| Williamson | Yes (on August 20) | No (1 qualifying poll) | No | |
| Bennet | No (~28,000 donors on June 30) | No (0 qualifying polls) | No | |
| Bullock | No (~17,000 donors on June 30) | No (0 qualifying polls) | No | |
| Delaney | No (~8,000 donors on June 30) | No (0 qualifying polls) | No | |
| Messam | No | No (0 qualifying polls) | No | |
| Ryan | No (~13,000 donors on July 12) | No (0 qualifying polls) | No | |
| Sestak | No | No (0 qualifying polls) | No | |
| de Blasio | No (~7,000 donors on June 30) | No (0 qualifying polls) | No | |
Withdrawn candidate

==== Summary ====
Democratic Party debates

Fourth Democratic debate
- Host: CNN; The New York Times
- Date(s): October 15, 2019
- Venue: Rike Physical Education Center; Otterbein University
- Location: Westerville, Ohio
- Lead moderator: Anderson Cooper
- Other moderators: Erin Burnett; Marc Lacey

External videos
- CNN; The New York Times; Democratic Debate, Westerville, Ohio; October 15, 2019
- CNN Replay, CNN via Facebook
- full video – Part 1
- full video – Part 2
- full video – Part 3
- full video – Part 4
- full video – Parts 1,2,3,4

The Democratic Party's fourth presidential debate was held on Tuesday October 15, 2019, in Westerville, Ohio, from 8 to 11 p.m. EDT. On September 27, the DNC announced that the debate would include all 12 candidates on one night, although some had assumed it would take place on two nights since it had more than 10 participants. From left to right, the candidates were: Gabbard (who missed the previous debate), Steyer (in his first debate), Booker, Harris, Sanders, Biden and Warren (who shared center stage), Buttigieg, Yang, O'Rourke, Klobuchar, and Castro. Podium order for the debate was determined based on an average of the 10 most recently released qualifying polls. CNN anchors Erin Burnett and Anderson Cooper and New York Times national editor Marc Lacey served as the debate moderators.

The debate aired exclusively on CNN, CNN International and CNN en Español, and was streamed on CNN.com's homepage and NYTimes.com's homepage. The debate also streamed live on the following Facebook Pages: CNN, CNN International, CNN Politics, CNN Replay, AC360 and Erin Burnett OutFront.

In addition, the debate was available across mobile devices via CNN's and New York Times' apps for iOS and Android, via CNNgo apps for Apple TV, Roku, Amazon Fire, Chromecast and Android TV, SiriusXM Channels 116, 454 and 795, the Westwood One Radio Network and National Public Radio.

The Ohio debate featured 12 candidates, setting a record for the highest number of candidates in one presidential debate.

| Candidates | Airtime (min.) |
|---|---|
| Warren | 22.8 |
| Biden | 16.7 |
| Klobuchar | 13.3 |
| O'Rourke | 13.2 |
| Sanders | 13.1 |
| Buttigieg | 13.0 |
| Harris | 12.4 |
| Booker | 11.7 |
| Yang | 8.5 |
| Castro | 8.4 |
| Gabbard | 8.4 |
| Steyer | 7.2 |
| Average | 12.4 |

=== Fifth debate (November 20, 2019) ===
==== Qualification ====
A memo released by the DNC on September 23 indicated that the qualification period for the November debate started on September 13, and ended on November 13. To qualify in terms of polling, candidates needed to reach three percent or more in four polls approved by the DNC. Alternatively, reaching five percent or more in two DNC-approved polls conducted in Iowa, New Hampshire, Nevada or South Carolina was also accepted as meeting the polling threshold. To qualify in terms of donors, candidates needed to receive donations from 165,000 unique donors with 600 unique donors in 20 different states, territories or the District of Columbia. Three candidates (Messam, O'Rourke, and Ryan) suspended their campaigns between the fourth and fifth debates.

Qualification requirements for the fifth debate
| Four-Poll Threshold | A candidate needed to get at least three percent support in four different polls published from a list of approved pollsters between September 13 and November 13, which could not be based on open-ended questions and may have covered either the national level or one of the first four primary/caucus states (Iowa, New Hampshire, Nevada, and South Carolina). Only one poll from each approved pollster counted towards meeting the threshold for each region. The approved pollsters were the Associated Press, ABC News/The Washington Post, CBS News/YouGov, CNN, The Des Moines Register, Fox News, Monmouth University, National Public Radio, NBC News/The Wall Street Journal, NBC News/Marist, The Nevada Independent, The New York Times, Quinnipiac University, the University of New Hampshire, USA Today/Suffolk, and Winthrop University. For organizations that appear in pairs with other entities, only polls conducted by the listed pairings were permitted. Organizations listed individually may have partnered with any other entity or fielded polls independently. |
| Early State Polling Threshold | Alternatively to the four-poll threshold, a candidate could have qualified with at least five percent support in any two polls from the same list of organizations and time period. This threshold did not require that different organizations or regions be used, but did not include national polls. |
| Fundraising criterion | By the November 13 deadline, a candidate needed to receive financial support from a minimum of 165,000 unique donors, with at least 600 unique donors per state in at least 20 states. |

Qualified candidates for the fifth debate
| Candidate | Met donor criterion | Met four-poll criterion (as of November 13) | Met early state polling criterion (as of November 14) | Qualified for debate | Additional Ref(s) |
| Biden | Yes (by July 3) | Yes (25 qualifying polls) | Yes (18 qualifying polls) | Yes | |
| Sanders | Yes (by February 20) | Yes (25 qualifying polls) | Yes (18 qualifying polls) | Yes | |
| Warren | Yes (by July 8) | Yes (25 qualifying polls) | Yes (18 qualifying polls) | Yes | |
| Buttigieg | Yes (by July 1) | Yes (24 qualifying polls) | Yes (11 qualifying polls) | Yes | |
| Harris | Yes (by July 5) | Yes (23 qualifying polls) | Yes (6 qualifying polls) | Yes | |
| Yang | Yes (by August 15) | Yes (14 qualifying polls) | Yes (2 qualifying polls) | Yes | |
| Klobuchar | Yes (by September 23) | Yes (11 qualifying polls) | Yes (3 qualifying polls) | Yes | |
| Gabbard | Yes (by August 26) | Yes (5 qualifying polls) | Yes (2 qualifying polls) | Yes | |
| Steyer | Yes (by September 23) | Yes (13 qualifying polls) | No (0 qualifying polls) | Yes | |
| Booker | Yes (by September 29) | Yes (6 qualifying polls) | No (0 qualifying polls) | Yes | |
| Castro | Yes (by September 23) | No (0 qualifying polls) | No (0 qualifying polls) | No | |
| Williamson | No (~140,000 donors on October 4) | No (0 qualifying polls) | No (0 qualifying polls) | No | |
| Bennet | No (~28,000 donors on June 30) | No (0 qualifying polls) | No (0 qualifying polls) | No | |
| Bullock | No (~17,000 donors on June 30) | No (0 qualifying polls) | No (0 qualifying polls) | No | |
| Delaney | No (~8,000 donors on June 30) | No (0 qualifying polls) | No (0 qualifying polls) | No | |
| Sestak | No | No (0 qualifying polls) | No (0 qualifying polls) | No | |
| O'Rourke | Yes (before June 30) | No (2 qualifying polls) | No (0 qualifying polls) | No | |
| Ryan | No (~13,000 donors on July 12) | No (0 qualifying polls) | No (0 qualifying polls) | No | |
| Messam | No | No (0 qualifying polls) | No (0 qualifying polls) | No | |
Withdrawn candidate

==== Summary ====
Democratic Party debates

Fifth Democratic debate
- Host: MSNBC; The Washington Post
- Date(s): November 20, 2019
- Venue: Oprah Winfrey Soundstage 1, Van Horn Rd, Tyler Perry Studios
- Location: Atlanta, Georgia
- Other moderators: Rachel Maddow; Andrea Mitchell; Kristen Welker; Ashley Parker

The Democratic Party's fifth presidential debate was held on November 20, 2019, from 9 to 11:20 p.m. ET, at Tyler Perry Studios in Atlanta, Georgia. It was moderated by Rachel Maddow, Andrea Mitchell, Kristen Welker and Ashley Parker.

The candidates who qualified were Biden, Booker, Buttigieg, Gabbard, Harris, Klobuchar, Sanders, Steyer, Warren and Yang.

| Candidates | Airtime (min.) |
|---|---|
| Warren | 13.5 |
| Buttigieg | 12.9 |
| Biden | 12.8 |
| Sanders | 11.8 |
| Booker | 11.5 |
| Harris | 11.5 |
| Klobuchar | 11.0 |
| Gabbard | 9.2 |
| Steyer | 8.4 |
| Yang | 6.8 |

=== Sixth debate (December 19, 2019) ===
==== Qualification ====
A memo released by the DNC on October 25 indicated that the qualification period for the December debate started on October 16, and ended on December 12. To qualify in terms of polling, candidates had to reach four percent or more in four polls approved by the DNC. Alternatively, reaching six percent or more in two DNC-approved polls conducted in Iowa, New Hampshire, Nevada, or South Carolina was also accepted as meeting the polling threshold. To qualify in terms of donors, candidates had to receive donations from 200,000 unique donors with 800 unique donors in 20 different states, territories or the District of Columbia.

Qualification requirements for the sixth debate
| Four-Poll Threshold | A candidate needed at least four percent support in four different polls published from a list of approved pollsters between October 16 and December 12, which could not be based on open-ended questions and covered either the national level or one of the first four primary/caucus states (Iowa, New Hampshire, Nevada, and South Carolina). Only one poll from each approved pollster counted towards meeting the threshold for each region. The approved pollsters were the Associated Press, ABC News/The Washington Post, CBS News/YouGov, CNN, The Des Moines Register, Fox News, Monmouth University, National Public Radio, NBC News/The Wall Street Journal, NBC News/Marist, The Nevada Independent, The New York Times, Quinnipiac University, the University of New Hampshire, USA Today/Suffolk, and Winthrop University. For organizations that appear in pairs with other entities, only polls conducted by the listed pairings were permitted. Organizations listed individually could partner with any other entity or field polls independently. |
| Early State Polling Threshold | Alternatively to the four-poll threshold, a candidate qualified with at least six percent support in any two polls from the same list of organizations and time period. This threshold did not require that different organizations or regions be used, but did not include national polls. |
| Fundraising criterion | By the December 12 deadline, a candidate needed to receive financial support from a minimum of 200,000 unique donors, with at least 800 unique donors per state in at least 20 states. |

Qualified candidates for the sixth debate
| Candidate | Met donor criterion | Met four-poll criterion (as of December 13) | Met early state polling criterion (as of December 13) | Qualified for debate | Additional Ref(s) |
| Biden | Yes (by July 3) | Yes (22 qualifying polls) | Yes (15 qualifying polls) | Yes | |
| Sanders | Yes (by February 20) | Yes (22 qualifying polls) | Yes (15 qualifying polls) | Yes | |
| Warren | Yes (by July 8) | Yes (22 qualifying polls) | Yes (15 qualifying polls) | Yes | |
| Buttigieg | Yes (by July 1) | Yes (21 qualifying polls) | Yes (14 qualifying polls) | Yes | |
| Klobuchar | Yes (by October 26) | Yes (8 qualifying polls) | No (1 qualifying poll) | Yes | |
| Steyer | Yes (by December 3) | Yes (4 qualifying polls) | No (0 qualifying polls) | Yes | |
| Yang | Yes (by August 15) | Yes (4 qualifying polls) | No (0 qualifying polls) | Yes | |
| Gabbard | Yes (by November 28) | No (3 qualifying polls) | No (1 qualifying poll) | No | |
| Booker | Yes (by November 21) | No (0 qualifying polls) | No (0 qualifying polls) | No | |
| Castro | Yes (by December 5) | No (0 qualifying polls) | No (0 qualifying polls) | No | |
| Bloomberg | No (Note: Bloomberg is not collecting donations. To avoid being classified as receiving donations, the Bloomberg campaign reportedly sells campaign merchandise at its cost, preempting against the possibility of meeting the donor criterion.) | No (2 qualifying polls) | No (0 qualifying polls) | No | |
| Williamson | No (~140,000 donors on October 4) | No (0 qualifying polls) | No (0 qualifying polls) | No | |
| Bennet | No (~28,000 donors on June 30) | No (0 qualifying polls) | No (0 qualifying polls) | No | |
| Delaney | No (~8,000 donors on June 30) | No (0 qualifying polls) | No (0 qualifying polls) | No | |
| Patrick | No | No (0 qualifying polls) | No (0 qualifying polls) | No | |
| Harris | Yes (by July 5) | Yes (10 qualifying polls) | No (1 qualifying poll) | Yes | |
| Bullock | No | No (0 qualifying polls) | No (0 qualifying polls) | No | |
| Sestak | No | No (0 qualifying polls) | No (0 qualifying polls) | No | |
Withdrawn candidate

==== Summary ====
Democratic Party debates

Sixth Democratic debate
- Host: PBS NewsHour; Politico
- Date(s): December 19, 2019
- Venue: Gersten Pavilion; Loyola Marymount University
- Location: Los Angeles, California
- Lead moderator: Judy Woodruff
- Other moderators: Tim Alberta; Yamiche Alcindor; Amna Nawaz

External videos
- PBS NewsHour; Politico; Democratic Debate, Los Angeles, California, December 19, 2019
- Live Stream Recording, Politico via YouTube
- Live Stream Recording, PBS NewsHour via YouTube

The Democratic Party's sixth presidential debate was held on December 19, 2019, at 8 p.m. ET at Loyola Marymount University in Los Angeles, California, and was hosted by PBS NewsHour and Politico. It was initially set to be held at the University of California, Los Angeles. However, the DNC announced on November 6 that UCLA was no longer hosting the debate due to a labor dispute. Three candidates (Sestak, Bullock and Harris) suspended their campaigns between the fifth and sixth Democratic debates; Harris would have qualified for the sixth debate had her campaign continued.

Gabbard, a few days before failing to qualify for the debate, announced on December 9 that she would not participate regardless of whether she qualifies.

The debate aired on Politico.com, PBS, and CNN.

The candidates who qualified were Biden, Buttigieg, Klobuchar, Sanders, Steyer, Warren and Yang. Highlights included: an exchange between Buttigieg, Warren, and Sanders about campaign financing (including mention of a Buttigieg fundraiser in a Napa Valley wine cave), differences between Klobuchar and Buttigieg on the issue of experience, and a discussion about health care between Sanders and Biden. The candidates were in agreement about the impeachment of Donald Trump, which had been approved by the House of Representatives the day before. Sanders and Klobuchar had a disagreement about the United States–Mexico–Canada Agreement, with the former opposed to and the latter in favor of ratification. Yang, the only candidate of color, expressed lament that Kamala Harris and Cory Booker were absent, and declared that his universal-basic-income proposal would diversify the field. Sanders, Biden, and Warren parried a question about age. Steyer stated that climate change would be his top priority as president, and the issue was discussed at length by all the candidates.

The Chinese government censored a live feed of the debate after moderator Judy Woodruff asked Pete Buttigieg if the U.S. should boycott the 2022 Winter Olympics in Beijing over China's alleged human rights abuses of Uyghur citizens.

| Candidates | Airtime (min.) |
|---|---|
| Sanders | 20.5 |
| Klobuchar | 19.9 |
| Warren | 19.6 |
| Buttigieg | 19.6 |
| Biden | 15.5 |
| Steyer | 11.8 |
| Yang | 10.9 |

== Debates in 2020 ==
=== Seventh debate (January 14, 2020) ===
==== Qualification ====
A memo released by the DNC on December 20 indicated that the qualification period for the January debate started on November 14, 2019, and ended on January 10, 2020. A candidate needed to meet both polling and donor criteria. Candidates had to reach 5% or more in four polls approved by the DNC, or 7% or more in two DNC-approved polls conducted in Iowa, New Hampshire, Nevada, or South Carolina. In addition, candidates must have received donations from 225,000 unique donors, including 1,000 unique donors in 20 different states, territories or the District of Columbia. The candidates who qualified were Biden, Buttigieg, Klobuchar, Sanders, Steyer and Warren. This debate stage featured all of the candidates from the sixth debate except for Yang. Steyer qualified with 2 early-state polls on the penultimate day to qualify, while the other five all qualified much earlier. Yang and Booker met the fundraising criterion but failed to meet the polling criteria. Bloomberg met polling criteria but not the fundraising criterion, as he was not then asking for donations. Three candidates (Castro, Williamson and Booker) suspended their campaigns between the sixth and seventh debates, with Booker dropping out two days after the qualifying candidates were announced.

Qualification requirements for the seventh debate
| Four-Poll Threshold | A candidate needed at least five percent support in four different polls published from a list of approved pollsters between November 14, 2019, and January 10, 2020, which could not be based on open-ended questions and must have covered either the national level or one of the first four primary/caucus states (Iowa, New Hampshire, Nevada, and South Carolina). Only one poll from each approved pollster counts towards meeting the threshold for each region. The approved pollsters were the Associated Press, ABC News/The Washington Post, CBS News/YouGov, CNN, The Des Moines Register, Fox News, Monmouth University, National Public Radio, NBC News/The Wall Street Journal, NBC News/Marist, The Nevada Independent/Mellman Group, The New York Times, Quinnipiac University, the University of New Hampshire, USA Today/Suffolk, and Winthrop University. For organizations that appear in pairs with other entities, only polls conducted by the listed pairings are permitted. Organizations listed individually can partner with any other entity or field polls independently. |
| Early State Polling Threshold | Alternatively to the four-poll threshold, a candidate qualified with at least seven percent support in any two polls from the same list of organizations and time period. This threshold did not require that different organizations or regions be used, but also did not include national polls. |
| Fundraising criterion | By the January 10, 2020 deadline, a candidate needed to receive financial support from a minimum of 225,000 unique donors, with at least 1,000 unique donors per state in at least 20 states and/or territories. |

Qualified candidates for the seventh debate
| Candidate | Met donor criterion | Met four-poll criterion (as of January 10, 2020) | Met early state polling criterion (as of January 10, 2020) | Qualified for debate | Additional Ref(s) |
| Biden | Yes (by July 3, 2019) | Yes (16 qualifying polls) | Yes (13 qualifying polls) | Yes | |
| Sanders | Yes (by February 20, 2019) | Yes (16 qualifying polls) | Yes (13 qualifying polls) | Yes | |
| Warren | Yes (by July 8, 2019) | Yes (16 qualifying polls) | Yes (13 qualifying polls) | Yes | |
| Buttigieg | Yes (by July 1, 2019) | Yes (15 qualifying polls) | Yes (10 qualifying polls) | Yes | |
| Klobuchar | Yes (by December 20, 2019) | Yes (6 qualifying polls) | Yes (2 qualifying polls) | Yes | |
| Steyer | Yes (by January 3, 2020) | No (3 qualifying polls) | Yes (2 qualifying polls) | Yes | |
| Bloomberg | No | Yes (5 qualifying polls) | No (0 qualifying polls) | No | |
| Yang | Yes (by August 15, 2019) | No (2 qualifying polls) | No (0 qualifying polls) | No | |
| Gabbard | No (216,751 donors by January 4, 2020) | No (0 qualifying polls) | No (0 qualifying polls) | No | |
| Bennet | No (~28,000 donors on June 30, 2019) | No (0 qualifying polls) | No (0 qualifying polls) | No | |
| Delaney | No (~8,000 donors on June 30, 2019) | No (0 qualifying polls) | No (0 qualifying polls) | No | |
| Patrick | No | No (0 qualifying polls) | No (0 qualifying polls) | No | |
| Booker | Yes (by December 20, 2019) | No (0 qualifying polls) | No (0 qualifying polls) | No | |
| Castro | No (~200,000 donors on December 5, 2019) | No (0 qualifying polls) | No (0 qualifying polls) | No | |
| Williamson | No (~140,000 donors on October 4, 2019) | No (0 qualifying polls) | No (0 qualifying polls) | No | |
Withdrawn candidate

==== Summary ====
Democratic Party debates

Seventh Democratic debate
- Host: CNN; Des Moines Register
- Date(s): January 14, 2020
- Venue: Drake University
- Location: Des Moines, Iowa
- Lead moderator: Wolf Blitzer
- Other moderators: Brianne Pfannenstiel; Abby Phillip

The Democratic Party's seventh presidential debate was held from 8 to 10:15 p.m. CT on Tuesday, January 14, 2020, at Drake University in Des Moines, Iowa. It was hosted by CNN and The Des Moines Register. Several sources noted an exchange between Warren and Sanders. They discussed Warren's accusation that Sanders told her privately that women could not successfully win the presidency. Sanders flatly denied this accusation and pointed to his deference to Warren before running for president in 2016. Warren insisted that Sanders had said women could not win and pointed out that the women on stage had not lost any election, while the men on stage had lost 10 elections combined.

At the end of the debate when candidates were shaking hands with one another, Warren was seen declining a handshake from Bernie Sanders; the two candidates then appeared to argue with each other. It was later revealed that Warren commented to Sanders, "I think you called me a liar on national TV." Sanders replied, "Let's not do it right now. You want to have that discussion, we'll have that discussion. You called me a liar."

| Candidates | Airtime (min.) |
|---|---|
| Warren | 18.9 |
| Sanders | 17.8 |
| Klobuchar | 17.6 |
| Buttigieg | 16.7 |
| Biden | 16.3 |
| Steyer | 12.6 |

=== Eighth debate (February 7, 2020) ===
==== Qualification ====
The qualifications for the eighth debate were similar to those for the January debate (5% nationally/early states, or 7% in early states, this time excluding Iowa) except for the added provision that all candidates who gained at least one pledged delegate in the Iowa caucus (which is expected to apply only to candidates supported by at least 15% of the final votes statewide or in a district) would also automatically qualify for the debate. Candidates had until February 6 to qualify.

The candidates who qualified included Biden, Buttigieg, Klobuchar, Sanders, Steyer, Warren, and Yang.

One candidate (Delaney) suspended his campaign between the seventh and eighth debates.

Qualification requirements for the eighth debate
| Four-Poll Threshold | A candidate needed at least five percent support in four different polls published from a list of approved pollsters between December 13, 2019, and February 6, 2020, which can not be based on open-ended questions and must cover either the national level or the remaining early states of New Hampshire, Nevada, or South Carolina. Only one poll from each approved pollster counted towards meeting the threshold for each region. The approved pollsters are the Associated Press, ABC News/The Washington Post, CBS News/YouGov, CNN, Fox News, Monmouth University, National Public Radio/PBS Newshour/Marist, NBC News/The Wall Street Journal, NBC News/Marist,The New York Times/Siena College, The Nevada Independent/Mellman Group, Quinnipiac University, the University of New Hampshire, USA Today/Suffolk, and Winthrop University. For organizations that appear in pairs with other entities, only polls conducted by the listed pairings are permitted. Organizations listed individually can partner with any other entity or field polls independently. |
| Early State Polling Threshold | Alternatively to the four-poll threshold, a candidate qualified with at least seven percent support in any two polls from the same list of organizations and time period in the remaining early states of New Hampshire, Nevada, or South Carolina. This threshold does not require that different organizations or regions be used, but also does not include national polls. |
| Fundraising criterion | By the February 6, 2020 deadline, a candidate needed to receive financial support from a minimum of 225,000 unique donors, with at least 1,000 unique donors per state in at least 20 states and/or territories. |
| Delegate Threshold | A candidate will automatically qualify if he or she gained at least one pledged delegate from Iowa for the Democratic National Convention even if no other requirements are met. Because the opinions of Iowa voters are included in this way, polls of Iowa can no longer be considered qualifying under either the Four Poll Threshold or the Early State Polling Threshold. |

Qualified candidates for the eighth debate
| Candidate | Met donor criterion | Met four-poll criterion (as of February 7, 2020) | Met early state polling criterion (as of February 7, 2020) | Met delegate threshold | Qualified for debate | Additional Ref(s) |
| Buttigieg | Yes (by July 1, 2019) | Yes (14 qualifying polls) | Yes (6 qualifying polls) | Yes (14 delegates) | Yes | |
| Sanders | Yes (by February 20, 2019) | Yes (15 qualifying polls) | Yes (8 qualifying polls) | Yes (12 delegates) | Yes | |
| Warren | Yes (by July 8, 2019) | Yes (15 qualifying polls) | Yes (8 qualifying polls) | Yes (8 delegates) | Yes | |
| Biden | Yes (by July 3, 2019) | Yes (15 qualifying polls) | Yes (8 qualifying polls) | Yes (6 delegates) | Yes | |
| Klobuchar | Yes (by December 20, 2019) | Yes (8 qualifying polls) | Yes (3 qualifying polls) | Yes (1 delegate) | Yes | |
| Steyer | Yes (by January 3, 2020) | No (3 qualifying polls) | Yes (3 qualifying polls) | No (0 delegates) | Yes | |
| Yang | Yes (by August 15, 2019) | Yes (6 qualifying polls) | No (0 qualifying polls) | No (0 delegates) | Yes | |
| Bloomberg | No | Yes (7 qualifying polls) | No (0 qualifying polls) | No (0 delegates) | No | |
| Gabbard | Yes (by January 26, 2020) | No (2 qualifying polls) | No (0 qualifying polls) | No (0 delegates) | No | |
| Bennet | No (~28,000 donors on June 30, 2019) | No (0 qualifying polls) | No (0 qualifying polls) | No (0 delegates) | No | |
| Patrick | No | No (0 qualifying polls) | No (0 qualifying polls) | No (0 delegates) | No | |
| Delaney | No (~8,000 donors on June 30, 2019) | No (0 qualifying polls) | No (0 qualifying polls) | No (0 delegates) | No | |
Withdrawn candidate

==== Summary ====
Democratic Party debates

Eighth Democratic debate
- Host: ABC News; WMUR-TV; Apple News
- Date(s): February 7, 2020
- Venue: Saint Anselm College
- Location: Manchester, New Hampshire
- Other moderators: Linsey Davis; Monica Hernandez; David Muir; Adam Sexton; George Stephanopoulos

External videos
- ABC News; Democratic Debate, Manchester, New Hampshire, February 7, 2020
- Live Stream Recording, ABC News via YouTube

The Democratic Party's eighth presidential debate was held from 8–10:30 p.m. ET on Friday, February 7, 2020, at Saint Anselm College in Manchester, New Hampshire. It was hosted by ABC's New Hampshire affiliate WMUR-TV and Apple News.

Emerging as frontrunners after the Iowa caucuses, Buttigieg and Sanders came under attack by other candidates. Klobuchar questioned Buttigieg on his lack of political experience, whereas Biden pressed Sanders to clarify how he would fund Medicare For All and brought up his past stances on gun control, citing Sanders's votes against the Brady Bill in the 1990s. Moderator Linsey Davis also inquired Buttigieg on the rise in marijuana-related incarcerations of African Americans in South Bend during his tenure as mayor, which he attributed to "systemic racism". Candidates also voiced praise for Senator Mitt Romney of Utah, who was the only Republican senator to vote against Donald Trump's acquittal in his Senate impeachment trial two days earlier, and Lt. Col. Alexander Vindman, who was fired from the National Security Council by Trump after serving as a key witness on the trial. On the topic of campaign finance, Elizabeth Warren stated that political action committees had assisted all of the non-billionaire candidates except for Amy Klobuchar and herself. Another prominent issue discussed in the debate was abortion, with several candidates pledging to only support Supreme Court nominees who will uphold abortion rights and pushed for the codification of Roe v. Wade.

| Candidates | Airtime (min.) |
|---|---|
| Sanders | 20.1 |
| Biden | 19.6 |
| Buttigieg | 18.5 |
| Klobuchar | 16.5 |
| Warren | 15.9 |
| Steyer | 13.9 |
| Yang | 8.1 |

=== Ninth debate (February 19, 2020) ===
==== Qualification ====
The DNC announced on January 31 that it was eliminating the donor threshold as a debate qualification requirement for any debate following the New Hampshire debate on February 7, which prompted criticism from several candidates as it was perceived to accommodate Bloomberg, who is not accepting individual donations. The polling thresholds were drastically increased since the last debate, with candidates now having to reach 10% in DNC-approved national polls or 12% in early state polls conducted in Nevada and South Carolina. Candidates who won at least one pledged delegate in the Iowa caucuses or New Hampshire primary were automatically qualified for the debate. Candidates had until February 18 to qualify.

The candidates who qualified included Biden, Bloomberg, Buttigieg, Klobuchar, Sanders, and Warren. Three candidates (Yang, Bennet, and Patrick) suspended their campaigns between the eighth and ninth debates.

Qualification requirements for the ninth debate
| Four-Poll Threshold | A candidate needed at least ten percent support in four different polls published from a list of approved pollsters between January 15 and February 18, 2020, which could not be based on open-ended questions and must have covered either the national level or the remaining early states of Nevada or South Carolina. Only one poll from each approved pollster counted towards meeting the threshold for each region. The approved pollsters were the Associated Press, ABC News/The Washington Post, CBS News/YouGov, CNN, Fox News, Monmouth University, National Public Radio, NBC News/The Wall Street Journal, NBC News/Marist, The New York Times, The Nevada Independent/Mellman Group, Quinnipiac University, USA Today/Suffolk, and Winthrop University. For organizations that appear in pairs with other entities, only polls conducted by the listed pairings were permitted. Organizations listed individually could partner with any other entity or field polls independently. Additionally, the DNC elected to add the Nevada poll commissioned by the Las Vegas Review-Journal and AARP Nevada, and fielded by WPA Intelligence. |
| Early State Polling Threshold | Alternatively to the four-poll threshold, a candidate theoretically could have qualified with at least twelve percent support in any two polls from the same list of organizations and time period in either of the remaining early states, Nevada or South Carolina. This threshold does not require that different organizations or regions be used, but also does not include national polls. However, no poll from the original list of qualifying organizations in either Nevada or South Carolina was published during the qualifying period. With only the single poll of Nevada added by the DNC available as an early state poll, meeting the early state threshold was impossible. |
| Delegate Threshold | A candidate could also automatically qualify if he or she gained at least one pledged delegate from Iowa or New Hampshire for the Democratic National Convention even if no other requirements were met. |

Qualified candidates for the ninth debate
| Candidate | Met four-poll criterion | Met early state polling criterion (not applicable, only 1 poll) | Met delegate threshold | Qualified for debate | Additional Ref(s) |
| Buttigieg | Yes (5 qualifying polls) | No (0 qualifying polls) | Yes (23 delegates) | Yes | |
| Sanders | Yes (8 qualifying polls) | No (1 qualifying poll) | Yes (21 delegates) | Yes | |
| Warren | Yes (8 qualifying polls) | No (1 qualifying poll) | Yes (8 delegates) | Yes | |
| Klobuchar | No (1 qualifying poll) | No (0 qualifying polls) | Yes (7 delegates) | Yes | |
| Biden | Yes (8 qualifying polls) | No (1 qualifying poll) | Yes (6 delegates) | Yes | |
| Bloomberg | Yes (5 qualifying polls) | No (0 qualifying polls) | No (0 delegates) | Yes | |
| Steyer | No (1 qualifying poll) | No (0 qualifying polls) | No (0 delegates) | No | |
| Gabbard | No (0 qualifying polls) | No (0 qualifying polls) | No (0 delegates) | No | |
| Bennet | No (0 qualifying polls) | No (0 qualifying polls) | No (0 delegates) | No | |
| Patrick | No (0 qualifying polls) | No (0 qualifying polls) | No (0 delegates) | No | |
| Yang | No (0 qualifying polls) | No (0 qualifying polls) | No (0 delegates) | No | |
Withdrawn candidate

==== Summary ====
Democratic Party debates

Ninth Democratic debate
- Host: NBC News; MSNBC; The Nevada Independent
- Date(s): February 19, 2020
- Venue: Paris Las Vegas
- Location: Paradise, Nevada
- Other moderators: Vanessa Hauc; Lester Holt; Hallie Jackson; Jon Ralston; Chuck Todd

External videos
- NBC News / MSNBC; Democratic Debate, Las Vegas, Nevada, February 20, 2020
- Live Stream Recording, NBC News via YouTube

The Democratic Party's ninth presidential debate was held from 6–8 p.m. PST on Wednesday, February 19, 2020, at Paris Las Vegas in Paradise, Nevada. It was hosted by NBC News and MSNBC, in partnership with The Nevada Independent.

Bloomberg, who made his debate stage debut after qualifying only a day prior, was widely regarded by multiple news outlets as having performed poorly. Bloomberg's political and personal record came under heavy scrutiny by other candidates, including his previous support of stop-and-frisk policies during his tenure as mayor of New York City. The controversial program, which disproportionately targeted racial minorities, was referred to by Biden as "abhorrent" and "a violation of every right people have". Warren reprimanded Bloomberg for his recently resurfaced derogatory comments on women and called for him to rescind the non-disclosure agreements he signed with several of his company's former female employees over sexual harassment and workplace discrimination, accusing Bloomberg of attempting to "muzzle" them.

Sanders's electability was also brought up in the debate, when moderator Lester Holt mentioned the findings of a recent NBC News/Wall Street Journal poll which showed that two thirds of American voters would not be comfortable with a socialist presidential candidate; Sanders retorted by touting his wide lead over other candidates in the same poll. Bloomberg criticized Sanders's advocacy of democratic socialism by comparing it to communism, which Sanders dismissed as a "cheap shot", arguing that his economic policies were closer to Nordic social democracy. Buttigieg, meanwhile, branded both Sanders and Bloomberg as polarizing figures who would further divide the party if one of them were to receive the nomination.

Healthcare was another issue discussed by the candidates, in light of the Culinary Workers Union's recent criticism that Sanders's Medicare for All policy would replace their existing union healthcare in favor of a government plan. In response, Sanders defended his plan by saying that it would expand, rather than take away, healthcare benefits for union members. Warren attacked Buttigieg and Klobuchar on their more moderate healthcare plans, likening their lack of details to a "PowerPoint" presentation and "Post-it Note" respectively. On the other hand, Klobuchar argued that Sanders's Medicare for All proposal would be too radical to garner enough support in the Senate, whereas Buttigieg expressed disapproval at the idea of letting the government decide what healthcare plan is best for unions, calling it "condescension and arrogance".

The televised debate drew a combined 19.7 million viewers on NBC and MSNBC, making it the most-watched Democratic primary debate of all time.

| Candidates | Airtime (min.) |
|---|---|
| Warren | 16.6 |
| Klobuchar | 15.9 |
| Sanders | 15.4 |
| Buttigieg | 14.8 |
| Biden | 13.4 |
| Bloomberg | 13.0 |

=== Tenth debate (February 25, 2020) ===
==== Qualification ====
The qualification criteria remained largely unchanged from the last debate, with candidates having to either garner at least 10% support in DNC-approved national polls or 12% in early state polls conducted in the remaining state of South Carolina in order to meet the polling threshold. Candidates could also qualify via the delegate threshold by winning at least one pledged delegate in Iowa, New Hampshire or Nevada. The qualification deadline for the debate was February 24.

All candidates still in the race at the time (Biden, Bloomberg, Buttigieg, Klobuchar, Sanders, Steyer and Warren), except for Gabbard, qualified for the debate.

Qualification requirements for the tenth debate
| Four-Poll Threshold | A candidate will need at least ten percent support in four different polls published from a list of approved pollsters between February 4, 2020, and February 24, 2020, which can not be based on open-ended questions and must cover either the national level or the remaining early state of South Carolina. Only one poll from each approved pollster counts towards meeting the threshold for each region. The approved pollsters are the Associated Press, ABC News/The Washington Post, CBS News/YouGov, CNN, Fox News, Monmouth University, National Public Radio, NBC News/The Wall Street Journal, NBC News/Marist,The New York Times, Quinnipiac University, USA Today/Suffolk, and Winthrop University. For organizations that appear in pairs with other entities, only polls conducted by the listed pairings are permitted. Organizations listed individually can partner with any other entity or field polls independently. The DNC may choose to add an additional South Carolina-specific poll sponsor to this list. |
| Early State Polling Threshold | Alternatively to the four-poll threshold, a candidate will qualify with at least twelve percent support in any two polls from the same list of organizations and time period in the remaining early state, South Carolina. This threshold does not require that different organizations or regions be used, but also does not include national polls. |
| Delegate Threshold | A candidate will automatically qualify if he or she gains at least one pledged delegate from any of the three preceding early states of Iowa, New Hampshire, or Nevada for the Democratic National Convention even if no other requirements are met. |

Qualified candidates for the tenth debate
| Candidate | Met four-poll criterion (as of February 24, 2020) | Met early state polling criterion (as of February 24, 2020) | Met delegate threshold | Qualified for debate | Additional Ref(s) |
| Sanders | Yes (9 qualifying polls) (Note: 6 from national; 3 from South Carolina) | Yes (3 qualifying polls) | Yes (45 delegates) | Yes | |
| Buttigieg | Yes (5 qualifying polls) (Note: 4 from national 1 from South Carolina) | No (0 qualifying polls) | Yes (26 delegates) | Yes | |
| Biden | Yes (9 qualifying polls) | Yes (3 qualifying polls) | Yes (15 delegates) | Yes | |
| Warren | Yes (7 qualifying polls) (Note: 6 from national; 1 from South Carolina) | No (1 qualifying poll) | Yes (8 delegates) | Yes | |
| Klobuchar | No (0 qualifying polls) | No (0 qualifying polls) | Yes (7 delegates) | Yes | |
| Bloomberg | Yes (6 qualifying polls) (Note: 6 from national) | No (0 qualifying polls) | No (0 delegates) | Yes | |
| Steyer | No (3 qualifying polls) (Note: 3 from South Carolina) | Yes (3 qualifying polls) | No (0 delegates) | Yes | |
| Gabbard | No (0 qualifying polls) | No (0 qualifying polls) | No (0 delegates) | No | |

==== Summary ====
Democratic Party debates

Tenth Democratic debate
- Host: CBS News; Congressional Black Caucus Institute
- Date(s): February 25, 2020
- Venue: Gaillard Center
- Location: Charleston, South Carolina
- Other moderators: Margaret Brennan; Major Garrett; Gayle King; Norah O'Donnell; Bill Whitaker

External videos
- CBS News; Democratic Debate, Charleston, South Carolina, February 25, 2020
- Live Stream Recording, CBS News via YouTube

The Democratic Party's tenth presidential debate was held from 8–10 p.m. ET on Tuesday, February 25, 2020, at the Gaillard Center in Charleston, South Carolina. It was hosted by CBS News and the Congressional Black Caucus Institute in partnership with Twitter, and aired on CBS and BET.

Following his landslide victory in Nevada the prior week, Sanders was targeted by several other candidates who attempted to dampen his momentum going into the upcoming South Carolina and Super Tuesday primaries. Biden hit Sanders on the issue of gun control by drawing a contrast between Sanders's voting record and his own, noting that he was a consistent supporter of more stringent gun regulations throughout his Senate career. Biden highlighted his role in passing legislation to expand universal background checks and extend waiting periods for purchasing guns, while pointing out that Sanders previously had a relatively moderate stance on gun control, voting against the Brady Bill and in favor of the PLCAA during his tenure as a congressman. However, his claim that "150 million people have been killed since 2007" by guns was fact-checked by CNN as being incorrect, with a Biden campaign spokesperson suggesting that he might have intended to say 150,000. Sanders expressed regret at his decisions, admitting that he has "cast thousands of votes, including bad votes", and noted that he had a D-minus rating from the NRA Political Victory Fund.

Foreign policy was extensively discussed by the candidates, which took up about 25 minutes of the debate. Sanders and Bloomberg clashed over past comments they have made regarding foreign authoritarian leaders; Bloomberg emphasized recent allegations that Russian President Vladimir Putin was trying to prop up the Sanders campaign. When Sanders's praise for Fidel Castro's literacy programs in Cuba on 60 Minutes was brought up by Bloomberg, Sanders responded by calling out Bloomberg's refusal to call China's paramount leader Xi Jinping a dictator in an interview, and pointed out that Barack Obama had also previously praised Cuba's healthcare and education. This provoked a reaction from Biden, who said that while Obama did acknowledge Cuba's progress in increasing life expectancy during a 2016 town hall, he did not "in any way suggest that there was anything positive about the Cuban government" and proceeded to condemn the dictatorial regime.

The debate moderators received staunch criticism for focusing too much on narrowly focused policy issues, failure to keep control of the candidates' speaking times, allowing candidates to interrupt other candidates during their allotted speaking times, applying the debate rules regarding giving candidates time to respond to personal attacks in a non-equitable way, and for permitting the audience to boo and jeer certain candidates without consequence. Both Biden and Sanders criticized the moderators on stage for failing to enforce the debate rules. The crowd's negative reception of Sanders led to the proliferation of rumors on social media that the debate audience had been "stacked against" him, pointing to the high entry costs which ranged from $1,750 to $3,200 as evidence. The Democratic National Committee has denied this claim, explaining that the debate tickets were allocated among political organizations (DNC, CBCI and SCDP) and media entities (CBS and Twitter) hosting the debate as well as participating candidates' campaigns, with each campaign being given an equal quota. Tickets were guaranteed to sponsors, and the ticket costs referred to the cost of sponsorship.

| Candidates | Airtime (min.) |
|---|---|
| Sanders | 15.5 |
| Bloomberg | 13.6 |
| Klobuchar | 13.4 |
| Warren | 12.9 |
| Biden | 12.6 |
| Buttigieg | 11.6 |
| Steyer | 7.1 |

=== Eleventh debate (March 15, 2020) ===
Democratic Party debates

Eleventh Democratic debate
- Host: CNN; Univision; Congressional Hispanic Caucus
- Date(s): March 15, 2020
- Venue: CNN studio
- Location: Washington, D.C.
- Lead moderator: Jake Tapper
- Other moderators: Dana Bash; Ilia Calderón

External videos
- CNN/Univision/Congressional Hispanic Caucus Democratic Debate, Washington, D.C., March 15, 2020
- full video – Part 1
- full video – Part 2
- full video – Part 3
- full video – Part 4
- full video – Part 5
- full video – Part 6

CNN, Univision, and the Congressional Hispanic Caucus hosted the eleventh debate in Washington, D.C., from 8 P.M. to 10 P.M. Eastern Time.

Five candidates (Steyer, Buttigieg, Klobuchar, Bloomberg, and Warren) suspended their campaigns between the tenth and eleventh debates. On March 6, the DNC announced that qualification would be based on "earning at least 20 percent of delegates awarded by March 15", as calculated by the Associated Press or CNN.

The Democratic National Committee announced on March 10 that the debate would no longer allow a live audience, nor would press (beyond CNN and Univision) be allowed to attend, due to fears about the spread of the coronavirus.

On March 12, the Democratic National Committee announced that the March 15 debate, originally scheduled to take place at the Arizona Federal Theatre in Phoenix, Arizona, would instead be held at CNN's studio in Washington, D.C. It also announced that Jorge Ramos was no longer a moderator because he had contact with a person with coronavirus.

==== Qualification ====
Qualified candidates for the eleventh debate
| Candidate | 20% delegate threshold | | Qualified for debate | Additional Ref(s) |
| Candidate | AP | CNN | Qualified for debate | Additional Ref(s) |
| Biden | Yes (890 delegates) | Yes (809 delegates) | Yes | |
| Sanders | Yes (736 delegates) | Yes (666 delegates) | Yes | |
| Gabbard | No (2 delegates) | No (2 delegates) | No | |
| Warren | No (71 delegates) | No (44 delegates) | No | |
| Bloomberg | No (61 delegates) | No (24 delegates) | No | |
| Buttigieg | No (26 delegates) | No (26 delegates) | No | |
| Klobuchar | No (7 delegates) | No (7 delegates) | No | |
| Steyer | No (0 delegates) | No (0 delegates) | No | |
Withdrawn candidate

==== Summary ====
The debate was primarily focused on the COVID-19 pandemic, which was discussed for 17 minutes and 45 seconds, with Biden claiming the Trump administration rejected test kits from the WHO. Both candidates also compared the pandemic to that of the Ebola epidemic.

=== Cancelled twelfth debate ===
In an interview with Politico regarding the March 15 debate, a DNC official confirmed a twelfth debate was still being planned. Two candidates (Gabbard and Sanders) suspended their campaigns between the eleventh and twelfth debates, leaving Biden as the only remaining major candidate. Prior to suspending his campaign, Sanders stated that he planned to participate in the debate. Biden dismissed the idea, however:

"My focus is just dealing with this crisis right now. I haven't thought about any more debates. I think we've had enough debates. I think we should get on with this."

It is likely that the debate would have been hosted in an East Coast location, such as New York City.

On April 8, 2020, Sanders dropped out of the Democratic primary, leaving Joe Biden as the presumptive Democratic nominee. In early June 2020, Biden passed the threshold of 1,991 delegates to gain the nomination at the 2020 Democratic National Convention.

== Incidents and controversies ==
=== Climate change debate ===
On April 22, 2019, Jay Inslee proposed that the DNC dedicate one of its presidential debates to climate change, giving candidates a chance to elaborate in full detail on how they intend to implement climate action and achieve the goals presented by the Green New Deal (a progressive climate resolution proposed by Democratic members of the House of Representatives). Recent polls of both Democratic voters and the electorate in general had identified this topic to be of the highest importance (for example, a CNN poll found 80% of Democrats wanted presidential candidates to make climate change a top priority, and a Morning Consult poll of registered voters nationwide found that 63% said it's either important or a top priority for Congress to pass a bill to address climate change). Despite support from seven other candidates (Bernie Sanders, Elizabeth Warren, Kirsten Gillibrand, Julian Castro, Michael Bennet, John Delaney and Seth Moulton), several progressive and environmental groups (Sierra Club, CREDO Action, Sunrise Movement, Friends of the Earth Action, Public Citizen, 350 Action, MoveOn, Youth Climate Strike), at least two dozen Democratic lawmakers from the House and Senate, and over 52,000 signatories of a petition, the DNC turned down the idea of limiting some of their debates to only one debate topic. On June 29, 2019, however, the DNC referred to a committee a proposal "calling for an official debate on climate change". On August 22, the resolutions committee voted to reject the proposal.

=== Steve Bullock's qualification for first debate ===
After Steve Bullock received 1% in an open-ended ABC News/The Washington Post poll, controversy arose as the DNC's official qualification rules, published on February 14 and updated on May 9, did not state whether open-ended polls would count towards qualification. The DNC later stated during rule guidance given on June 10 and 11, that "polls based on open-ended questions will not be considered". This additional rule was initially orally communicated between DNC chairman Tom Perez and the Bullock campaign in March 2019, and was only publicly confirmed via a statement to a Politico reporter on June 6, but was never confirmed in writing by any primary DNC sources ahead of the qualification deadline.

On June 12, the Bullock campaign wrote a certification letter to the DNC claiming that Bullock qualified for participation in the first debate through the polling criteria (as they believed the open-ended poll from ABC News/The Washington Post should be counted as Bullock's third qualifying poll, according to the official published rules). If Bullock had been deemed a qualifying candidate by the DNC, then 21 total candidates would have qualified by the polling criteria. However, the DNC explicitly limited the debate stage to 20 candidates, so that would have triggered tiebreak rules. Bullock and Eric Swalwell were tied for the 20th spot with each candidate having 1% polling averages and three qualifying polls with exactly 1% support. In that scenario, the DNC would have had to accept inviting 21 candidates, or invent a supplementing final tiebreak rule (for example, drawing lots for the last spot, or deciding the tie by their number of unique donors). However, Bullock's certification letter was rejected and he failed to qualify for the first debate, though he qualified for the second debate.

=== Debate protests ===
==== Second debate protest ====
On the second night of the second debate, protesters motivated by the death of Eric Garner and the continued employment of Staten Island police officer Daniel Pantaleo shouted during Bill de Blasio's opening remarks, and then entirely halted Cory Booker's, disrupting the debate for nearly 30 seconds.

==== Third debate protest ====
During the closing statements for the third debate, in which candidates were asked to recall moments of resilience after a professional setback, protesters interrupted Joe Biden for approximately two minutes. According to Jess Davidson, they shouted "we are DACA recipients; our lives are at risk!" The Trump campaign accused the protesters of having insensitive timing.

==== Ninth debate protest ====
Immigrant rights protestors interrupted Biden's closing statement.

==== Tenth debate protest ====
Some people in the audience of the tenth debate booed candidates.

=== Tulsi Gabbard disputes with DNC ===
==== Pollster selection and poll frequency ====
On August 23, Gabbard's campaign protested the failure of the DNC to release "their criteria for selecting the 16 polling organizations they deem 'certified'" for qualifying candidates for the third debate. In the campaign's statement, they listed 26 polls in which Gabbard reached the 2% threshold and alleged that certain "DNC-certified" polls were rated lower than non-certified polls by organizations such as the American Research Group and FiveThirtyEight, and questioned why only four qualifying polls were released following the second debate, while fourteen were released following the first debate; and why only two polls were released in the first two weeks after the second debate while six polls were released in the first two weeks after the first debate. The campaign further argued that the lack of polling was "particularly harmful to candidates with lower name-recognition." They called on the DNC to revise the set of polls it considers for qualifying and also asked them "to hold true to their promise and make adjustments to the process now to ensure transparency and fairness."

Several other campaigns, including those of Michael Bennet, Tom Steyer, and Marianne Williamson also criticized the unclear criteria, and overall lack, of qualifying polls.

==== Qualifying polls for October debate ====
On September 8, a The Washington Post/ABC News poll was released. An initial report from ABC claimed that Gabbard had not received the 2% necessary for the poll to count as a qualifying poll, but the Gabbard campaign announced that she had indeed received the 2% necessary for the poll to count as a qualifying poll, citing The Washington Post figures directly. To further complicate matters, FiveThirtyEight claimed that it had received confirmation from the DNC that the poll did not count for Gabbard but the Gabbard campaign countered by stating that no official DNC ruling had been delivered.

The confusion stemmed from the fact that the poll data was presented with two sets of results: one of all adults, and one of registered voters. Gabbard reached 1% among all adults and 2% among registered voters. An approved poll conducted on July 1 was conducted similarly, but it is unclear which category was used for the qualification for the debates, as no candidate had 2% in one category and 1% in the other. Gabbard later reached 2% in two other qualifying polls, allowing her to qualify for the fourth debate.

==== Threatened boycotts ====
On October 10, Gabbard threatened to boycott the fourth debate, saying that she believed the DNC and the media were rigging the election. On October 14, Gabbard announced that she would be attending the debate. On December 9, Gabbard announced that she would boycott the sixth debate, and that instead she would be prioritizing campaigning in New Hampshire and South Carolina. She failed to qualify for the sixth debate by the deadline, December 12.

==== Eleventh debate qualification ====
On March 3, as Super Tuesday results were announced, DNC communications director Xochitl Hinojosa tweeted that the qualification threshold would likely increase, giving the reason that almost 2,000 delegates would have been allocated by the time of the debate. This tweet was sent after Gabbard apparently received a delegate and would qualify for the March debate, per the previous three debates' threshold of one delegate. She later gained another delegate. On March 6, the DNC confirmed that the single qualification for entry to the eleventh debate would be for a candidate to have earned at least 20 percent of awarded delegates by March 15. The threshold was impossible for her to meet to qualify for the eleventh debate.

=== Andrew Yang disputes ===
==== Microphone complaints in first debate ====
Yang, along with Marianne Williamson and Eric Swalwell, complained of microphone problems not allowing them to speak unless called upon when other candidates seemed to be able to freely interject at all times. NBC responded by stating that none of the candidates' microphones were turned off or muted.

==== Yang qualification for third debate ====
After Yang had received what he considered to be his fourth qualifying poll, the DNC revealed that qualifying polls conducted by different organizations would not be counted separately if they were sponsored by the same DNC-approved sponsor. The ruling was controversially disclosed by the DNC on July 30, less than one day after Yang had obtained 2% in four polls, rather than on July 19 when the second of these polls had been completed. In spite of this, Yang qualified for the third debate.

==== Yang disputes with MSNBC ====
In the fifth debate, Yang did not receive his first question until 32 minutes into the debate and spoke for considerably less time than all the other participants. Yang and his supporters criticized the network for what they saw as an undemocratic process. MSNBC asked Yang to join an unspecified program the weekend of November 24, but Yang said he would not appear until the network "apologizes on-air" and "discusses and includes [his] campaign consistent with [his] polling". Yang ended his boycott on December 27 by going on the TV show All in with Chris Hayes, stating "I decided that I'd prefer to speak to as many Americans as possible – our message is too important" on Twitter.

==== Yang qualification for seventh debate ====
Yang requested for the DNC to conduct more early state polls in December due to a lack of early state polling by qualifying pollsters. The DNC rejected this idea saying that conducting its own polls would call into question its impartiality.

=== Sixth debate labor disputes ===
The sixth debate was initially set to be held at the University of California, Los Angeles. However, the DNC announced on November 6 that UCLA was no longer hosting the debate due to a labor dispute.

Due to a Sodexo worker strike at the new venue, Loyola Marymount University, Warren announced that she would not attend the debate unless the labor dispute was resolved, followed soon after by Sanders and Yang. All of the remaining qualifying candidates (Biden, Buttigieg, Klobuchar, and Steyer) then followed suit over the next several days. The dispute was resolved on December 17, allowing the debate to move forward.

=== 2020 debates rule-change petition ===
Days before the December 2019 debate, for which Booker did not qualify, he sent a petition to the other candidates' campaigns in which he urged the DNC to change the qualification requirements for the upcoming debates in 2020 so that more non-white candidates could participate. All candidates that qualified for the December debate as well as Castro signed the petition. The DNC rejected the request to change the qualification criteria. The petition cites the New Hampshire Democratic Party central committee which voted to urge the DNC to "lift the barriers" on participation in further debates.

=== Seventh debate moderation controversies ===
During the seventh Democratic debate, January 14, hosted by CNN and the Des Moines Register, the wording of a series of questions from moderator Abby Phillip directed at senators Sanders and Warren drew criticisms from various other news outlets and from Sanders supporters. Following reports alleging that Sanders said to Warren in a 2018 private conversation that he did not believe that a woman could defeat Donald Trump in the 2020 presidential election, Sanders was given the question "Senator Warren confirmed in a statement, that in 2018 you told her that you did not believe that a woman could win the election. Why did you say that?" Sanders stated in his reply "as a matter of fact, I didn't say it" and received the follow-up question from Phillip: "I do want to be clear here, you're saying that you never told Senator Warren that a woman could not win the election?" to which Sanders replied "That is correct." Phillip's next question was directed at Warren, and was phrased: "Senator Warren, what did you think when Senator Sanders told you a woman could not win the election?"

MSNBC hosts Mika Brzezinski and Donny Deutsch the next day on Morning Joe criticized the question, describing it as "bizarre" and "a miss" respectively. Senior reporter at HuffPost Zach Carter stated that he believes CNN "botched" the debate and Matt Taibbi from Rolling Stone described the moderation as "shameful" and "villainous". Jeet Heer from The Nation commented that CNN was "the biggest loser of the night." Washington Examiner senior commentary writer Becket Adams described Phillip's question as "a hatchet job". The controversy also led to negative reactions on social media.

=== Michael Bloomberg's debate inclusion ===
In January, Michael Bloomberg became the only candidate to simultaneously reach the polling threshold and fail to reach the donor threshold since the DNC began requiring both with the third debate. According to Politico, some left-wing activists questioned whether the donor threshold should remain part of the qualification requirements, asserting that a candidate polling in the high single or low double digits should not be able to escape in-person scrutiny from other candidates who participate in the debates.

==== DNC debate qualification rules change ====
On January 31, the DNC announced that it would not impose a donor threshold starting with the ninth debate. DNC spokesperson Adrienne Watson stated that the prior rules were "appropriate for the opening stages of the race, when candidates were building their organizations and there were no metrics available outside of polling to distinguish those making progress from those who weren't." She said the DNC always had planned to change the debate qualification thresholds and that "we signaled it many times". She argued that the rule change was "not designed to benefit any one candidate" and declared that "every candidate has an equal opportunity to qualify".

==== Other candidates' reactions to Bloomberg's inclusion ====
Four candidates opposed the DNC's changing the rules allegedly to make sure Bloomberg qualifies for the debates. Sanders senior adviser Jeffrey P. Weaver stated that the rules changing "in the middle of the game" was wrong and "the definition of a rigged system". He also complained that Bloomberg "is trying to buy his way into the Democratic nomination". Warren tweeted, referencing Bloomberg's personal wealth, that "[b]illionaires shouldn't be allowed to play by different rules". She further objected that the DNC failed to change the debate qualification rules to "ensure diverse candidates could remain on the debate stage". Biden responded to a question about the issue by pointing out that Bloomberg is not "even on the ballot in Nevada" (the location of the first debate where Bloomberg qualified). Tulsi Gabbard remarked that "The DNC's and "corporate media partners'" playing favorites with candidates is "wrong" and that "[t]he DNC would rather hear from a billionaire than the only person of color left in this race, the first female combat veteran ever to run for president."

On the other hand, two of the candidates welcomed Bloomberg's inclusion. Buttigieg told reporters, "It is important that we have that process where folks have to stand with their competitors and explain why each of us is the best." Klobuchar took it a bit further, and stated that he should have to answer questions and not "hide behind the airwaves". She claimed that although she could not beat him "on the airwaves", she could beat him in a debate.

=== Criticisms about the tenth debate ===
==== Alleged influence efforts by Bloomberg ====
There were accusations online and in the media that Bloomberg had stacked the audience in his favor, though nothing was ever proven. The high ticket prices to the event were also heavily condemned. A 60-second ad for Bloomberg's campaign played during the first and second commercial breaks, drawing ire, especially online.

==== Moderation ====
CBS was also widely criticized for doing a poor job of moderating the debate and letting candidates talk over each other, often leading to 10–20 seconds of unintelligible shouting.

=== Criticisms about the eleventh debate ===
==== Announcement of change from prior format ====
Following Super Tuesday, the DNC and CNN announced that the eleventh debate would occur in a seated format with "a more intimate setting" and a "town hall-style production featuring audience questions," instead of the traditional format of the prior debates led by formal moderator questioning. This announcement was opposed by the Sanders campaign as "giving Biden too much of a break" and avoiding an "exchange of ideas", as well as criticized by commentators. These concerns became moot after the coronavirus pandemic forced the debate to be changed to the traditional moderator questioning format without any audience.

== See also ==
- 2004 Democratic Party presidential debates and forums
- 2008 Democratic Party presidential debates and forums
- 2016 Democratic Party presidential debates and forums
