= 2020 Democratic Party presidential forums =

Debates took place among candidates in the campaign for the Democratic Party's nomination for the president of the United States in the 2020 presidential election. Outside of DNC-sponsored debates, candidates are only allowed to attend events in which only one candidate speaks at a time.

== Forums ==
In addition to the party-sponsored debates, many private organizations host forums focusing on select issues and candidates. Candidates do not respond directly to each other at forums.

Past forums

#	Name	Issues	Date	Place	Sponsors	Ref
1	Heartland Forum	Economic issues affecting rural Americans	March 30, 2019	Buena Vista University; Storm Lake, IA	Open Markets Institute Action, HuffPost, Storm Lake Times, Iowa Farmers Union	
2	We the People Membership Summit	Various issues	April 1, 2019	Warner Theatre; Washington, DC	CPD Action, CWA, Planned Parenthood Action Fund, SEIU, SEIU 32BJ, Sierra Club	
3	She the People Presidential Forum	Issues affecting women of color	April 24, 2019	Texas Southern University; Houston, TX	She the People	
4	National Forum on Wages and Working People	Economic issues affecting low-income Americans	April 27, 2019	Las Vegas, NV	SEIU, CAP Action Fund	
5	Unity and Freedom Forum	Immigration reform and issues affecting Hispanic and Latino Americans	May 31, 2019	Pasadena, CA	FIRM Action, Community Change Action, CHIRLA Action Fund	
6	Big Ideas Forum	Ideas that can inspire voters and transform the country	June 1, 2019	Warfield Theatre; San Francisco, CA	MoveOn	
7	California Democratic Party State Convention	Various issues	May 31-June 2, 2019	San Francisco, CA	California Democratic Party	
8	Iowa Democratic Party "Hall of Fame" Dinner	Various issues	June 9, 2019	Cedar Rapids, IA	Iowa Democratic Party	
9	Presidential Candidates Forum	Economic opportunity for Black Americans	June 15, 2019 (Note: Air date: 10:00 A.M. ET/9:00 A.M. CT June 16, 2019, on BET.)	Charleston Music Hall; Charleston, SC	Black Economic Alliance	
10	Poor People's Campaign Presidential Forum	Issues affecting low-income Americans	June 17, 2019	Trinity Washington University; Washington, DC	Poor People's Campaign	
11	NALEO Presidential Candidate Forum	Issues affecting Hispanic and Latino Americans	June 21, 2019	Telemundo Center; Miami, FL	NALEO	
12	South Carolina Democratic Party Convention	Various issues	June 22, 2019	Columbia, SC	South Carolina Democratic Party	
13	We Decide	Reproductive health care and reproductive rights	June 22, 2019	University of South Carolina; Columbia, SC	Planned Parenthood Action Fund	
14	Strong Public Schools Presidential Forum	Issues affecting education and public schools	July 5, 2019	GRB Convention Center; Houston, TX	National Education Association	
15	LULAC Presidential Candidates Forum	Issues affecting Hispanic and Latino Americans	July 11, 2019	Wisconsin Center; Milwaukee, WI	LULAC, Univision	
16	Netroots Nation	Progressive issues and political organizing	July 11–13, 2019	Pennsylvania Convention Center; Philadelphia, PA	Netroots Foundation	
17	Iowa Presidential Candidate Forums	Issues affecting older voters in Iowa	July 15–20, 2019	Des Moines, Davenport, Cedar Rapids, Sioux City, and Council Bluffs, IA	AARP, The Des Moines Register	
18	2020 Presidential Candidates Forum	Various issues	July 24, 2019	Detroit, MI	NAACP	
19	Public Service Forum	Public service, trade unions, labor rights, and economy	Aug. 3, 2019	UNLV; Paradise, NV	AFSCME, HuffPost, The Nevada Independent	
20	Gun Sense Forum	Gun violence	Aug. 10, 2019	Des Moines, IA	Everytown for Gun Safety	
21	Des Moines Register Political Soapbox	20-minute speeches on their political platforms	Aug. 8–17, 2019	Iowa State Fair; Des Moines, IA	The Des Moines Register	
22	Frank LaMere Native American Presidential Forum	Issues affecting Native Americans	Aug. 19–20, 2019	Orpheum Theatre; Sioux City, IA	Four Directions, Native Organizers Alliance, and others	
23	ISNA Presidential Forum	Issues affecting Muslim Americans	Aug. 31, 2019	Houston, TX	Islamic Society of North America	
24	Climate Crisis Townhall	Global warming	Sept. 4, 2019	New York, NY	CNN	
25	New Hampshire Democratic Party Convention	Various issues	Sept. 7, 2019	SNHU; Manchester, NH	New Hampshire Democratic Party	
26	Asian American Pacific Islanders Democratic Presidential Forum	Issues affecting Asian Pacific Americans	Sept. 8, 2019	Segerstrom Center; Costa Mesa, CA	AAPI Victory Fund, Asian Americans Rising	
27	Workers’ Presidential Summit	Issues affecting labor unions and union workers	Sept. 17, 2019	Pennsylvania Convention Center; Philadelphia, PA	Philadelphia Council AFL–CIO	
28	Climate Forum	Climate change	Sept. 19–20, 2019	Georgetown University; Washington, DC	MSNBC, Georgetown University, Our Daily Planet	
29	LGBTQ Forum	LGBTQ rights	Sept. 20, 2019	Coe College; Cedar Rapids, IA	One Iowa, The Advocate, GLAAD	
30	People's Presidential Forum Iowa	Healthcare, green energy, education	Sept. 21, 2019	Des Moines, IA	ICCI Action Fund, People's Action	
31	Youth Forum	Students and youth issues	Sept. 22, 2019	Des Moines, IA	Des Moines Public Schools, Des Moines Register	
32	Gun Safety Forum	Gun violence	Oct. 2, 2019	Las Vegas, NV	Giffords, March For Our Lives	
33	LGBTQ Town Hall	LGBTQ rights	Oct. 10, 2019	Los Angeles, CA	Human Rights Campaign, UCLA, CNN	
34	People's Presidential Forum Nevada	Criminal justice reform, climate change, immigration, tribal sovereignty	Oct. 26, 2019	Las Vegas, NV	PLA of Nevada Action, People's Action	
35	Collegiate Bipartisan Presidential Forum	Students' interests, criminal justice reform, racial justice	Oct. 26–27, 2019	Benedict College; Columbia, SC	Mayor Steve Benjamin, Benedict College	
36	Justice Votes 2020	Criminal justice reform	Oct. 28, 2019	Eastern State Penitentiary; Philadelphia, PA	The Marshall Project, Voter Education Project	
37	Liberty and Justice Celebration	12-minute platform speeches	Nov. 1, 2019	Des Moines, IA	Iowa Democratic Party	
38	Problem Solver Convention	Various issues	Nov. 3, 2019	Manchester, NH	No Labels	
39	Presidential Forum on Environmental Justice	Environmental Justice	Nov. 8, 2019	SC State University; Orangeburg, SC	National Black Caucus of State Legislators	
40	California Democratic Party Fall Endorsing Convention Forum	Latino issues	Nov. 16, 2019	Long Beach Arena; Long Beach, CA	California Democratic Party, Univision	
41	"First in The West"	Various issues	Nov. 17, 2019	Las Vegas, NV	Nevada Democratic Party	
42	Teamsters Union Forum	Workers' rights	Dec. 7, 2019	Cedar Rapids, IA	IBT, Storm Lake Times, The Guardian	
43	Public Education Forum 2020	Education	Dec. 14, 2019	Pittsburgh, PA	AFT, NEA, Alliance to Reclaim Our Schools	
44	Unite for Mental Health: New Hampshire Town Hall	Mental health	Dec. 16, 2019	Saint Anselm College; Manchester, NH	Mental Health for US, National Council for Behavioral Health, NH Community Behavioral Health Association	
45	Iowa Brown & Black Presidential Forum	African-American and Latino issues	Jan. 20, 2020	Des Moines, Iowa	VICE News	
46	CNN New Hampshire Town Hall	Various issues	Feb. 5–6, 2020	Saint Anselm College; Manchester, NH	CNN	
47	Moving America Forward Infrastructure Forum	Infrastructure policy	Feb. 16, 2020	UNLV; Las Vegas, NV	IUOE, TWUA, APTA, ARTBA, AEM, ASCE, and others	
48	CNN Nevada Town Hall	Various issues	Feb. 18 & 20, 2020	Las Vegas, NV	CNN	
49	CNN South Carolina Town Hall	Various issues	Feb. 24 & 26, 2020	Charleston, South Carolina	CNN	
50	AIPAC Policy Conference	US-Israel relations	Mar. 2 & 3, 2020	Washington, D.C.	AIPAC, Conference of Presidents of Major American Jewish Organizations	

=== Forum participation ===
Ojeda withdrew before the beginning of the forums.

Candidate
Candidate	P Present I Invited N Not invited A Absent Out Not yet entered race W Withdrawn																			
Candidate	1	2	3	4	5	6	7	8	9	10	11	12	13	14	15	16	17	18	19	20
Michael Bennet	Out				A	A	A	P	A	P	A	P	P	A	A	A	P	A	P	P
Joe Biden	Out			A	A	A	A	A	A	P	A	P	P	P	A	A	P	P	P	P
Cory Booker	A	P	P	A	A	P	P	P	P	A	A	P	P	A	A	A	P	P	P	P
Steve Bullock	Out				A	A	A	P	A	A	A	A	A	A	A	A	P	A	P	P
Pete Buttigieg	Out		A	A	A	A	P	A	P	A	P	P	P	A	A	A	P	P	P	P
Julian Castro	P	P	P	P	P	P	P	A	A	A	P	P	P	P	P	P	P	P	P	P
Bill de Blasio	Out				A	A	A	P	A	A	A	P	P	P	A	A	A	A	P	P
John Delaney	P	A	A	A	A	A	P	P	A	A	A	P	P	A	A	A	P	A	P	P
Tulsi Gabbard	A	A	P	A	A	A	P	P	A	A	A	P	A	A	A	A	P	A	P	P
Kirsten Gillibrand	A	P	A	A	A	P	P	P	A	A	A	P	P	A	A	P	P	A	A	P
Kamala Harris	A	A	P	P	P	P	P	P	A	P	A	P	P	P	A	A	P	P	P	P
John Hickenlooper	A	A	A	P	A	A	P	P	A	A	P	P	P	A	A	A	P	A	N	P
Jay Inslee	A	P	A	A	P	A	P	P	A	A	A	P	P	P	A	P	N	A	P	P
Amy Klobuchar	P	P	P	P	A	P	P	P	A	A	P	P	P	P	A	A	P	P	P	P
Wayne Messam	A	A	A	A	A	A	A	A	A	P	A	A	A	A	A	A	N	A	N	N
Seth Moulton	Out		A	A	A	A	A	A	A	A	A	P	P	A	A	A	N	A	P	P
Beto O'Rourke	A	P	P	P	A	P	P	P	P	A	P	P	P	P	P	A	P	P	P	P
Tim Ryan	P (Note: Although Ryan was not a formal candidate at the time, he participated in the Heartland forum.)	Out	A	A	A	A	A	P	A	A	A	P	P	P	A	A	A	A	P	P
Bernie Sanders	A	P	P	A	P	P	P	P	A	P	P	P	P	P	P	A	P	P	P	P
Joe Sestak	Out													A	A	A	N	A	N	P
Tom Steyer	Out														A	A	N	A	P	P
Elizabeth Warren	P	P	P	P	A	P	P	P	P	P	P	P	P	P	P	P	P	P	P	P
Marianne Williamson	A	A	A	A	A	A	A	P	A	P	A	P	P	A	A	A	P	A	P	N
Andrew Yang	A	A	A	A	A	A	A	P	A	P	A	P	P	A	A	A	P	A	N	P
Mike Gravel	Out		A	A	A	A	A	A	A	A	A	A	A	A	A	A	N	A	A	W
Eric Swalwell	Out		A	A	A	A	P	P	A	P	P	P	P	A	W					

Candidate
Candidate	P Present I Invited N Not invited A Absent Out Not yet entered race W Withdrawn																			
Candidate	21	22	23	24	25	26	27	28	29	30	31	32	33	34	35	36	37	38	39	40
Michael Bennet	P	A	A	N	P	A	A	P	A	N	P	N	N	A	A	A	P	A	A	N
Joe Biden	P	A	A	P	P	A	P	A	P	N	A	P	P	A	P	A	P	A	A	A
Cory Booker	P	A	A	P	P	A	A	P	P	N	A	P	P	A	P	P	P	A	P	P
Steve Bullock	P	P	A	N	P	A	A	P	A	N	A	N	N	A	A	A	P	A	A	A
Pete Buttigieg	P	A	A	P	P	A	A	P	P	P	A	P	P	A	P	A	P	A	A	P
Julian Castro	P	P	P	P	P	A	A	P	P	P	A	P	P	P	P	A	P	A	A	P
John Delaney	P	P	A	N	P	A	A	P	A	N	A	N	N	A	P	A	P	P	P	N
Tulsi Gabbard	P	A	A	N	P	P	A	A	P	N	P	N	A	A	P	A	N	P	A	A
Kamala Harris	P	P	A	P	P	A	A	A	P	A	A	P	P	A	P	P	P	A	A	P
Amy Klobuchar	P	P	A	P	P	A	P	A	P	N	A	P	P	A	P	A	P	A	A	P
Wayne Messam	A	A	A	N	A	A	A	A	A	N	A	N	N	A	A	A	N	A	A	N
Deval Patrick	Out																			N
Bernie Sanders	P	P	P	P	P	A	P	P	A	P	P	A	A	P	P	A	P	A	A	P
Joe Sestak	P	P	A	N	P	A	A	A	P	N	P	N	N	A	A	A	N	A	P	N
Tom Steyer	P	A	A	N	P	P	P	P	A	N	P	N	P	A	A	P	P	A	P	P
Elizabeth Warren	P	P	A	P	P	A	A	A	P	P	A	P	P	A	P	A	P	A	P	A
Marianne Williamson	P	P	A	N	P	A	A	P	P	N	A	N	N	A	A	A	N	P	P	N
Andrew Yang	P	A	A	P	P	P	P	P	A	N	P	P	A	P	A	A	P	A	A	P
Beto O'Rourke	A	A	A	P	P	A	A	A	A	N	A	P	P	A	A	A	W			
Tim Ryan	P	A	A	N	P	A	A	P	A	N	A	N	N	W						
Bill de Blasio	P	P	A	N	P	A	P	A	W											
Kirsten Gillibrand	P	A	W																	
Seth Moulton	P	A	W																	
Jay Inslee	P	A	W																	
John Hickenlooper	P	W																		

Messam withdrew from the race between the 40th and 41st forum.

Candidate
Candidate	P Present I Invited N Not invited A Absent Out Not yet entered race W Withdrawn									
Candidate	41	42	43	44	45	46	47	48	49	50
Joe Biden	P	P	P	A	P	P	P	P	P	P
Tulsi Gabbard	A	A	A	P	A	N	A	N	N	N
Bernie Sanders	P	P	P	A	P	P	A	P	P	A
Elizabeth Warren	P	A	P	A	P	P	A	P	P	A
Michael Bloomberg	Out	A	N	A	N	N	A	A	P	P
Amy Klobuchar	P	P	P	A	P	P	P	P	P	P
Pete Buttigieg	P	P	P	A	P	P	P	P	P	P
Tom Steyer	P	P	P	A	A	P	P	N	P	W
Deval Patrick	P	A	A	P	A	P	W			
Andrew Yang	P	A	A	A	P	P	W			
Michael Bennet	P	A	P	A	P	N	W			
John Delaney	P	A	N	A	P	W				
Cory Booker	P	P	A	A	W					
Marianne Williamson	A	A	N	A	W					
Julian Castro	P	A	A	A	W					
Kamala Harris	A	W								
Steve Bullock	A	W								
Joe Sestak	P	W								

== Other participants ==
In a few of the forums, Republicans Bill Weld and Joe Walsh also participated. St. Anselm College's quadrennial "Lesser-Known Candidates Forum" took place on January 28, 2020.

== Incidents ==
=== Big Ideas Forum stage invasion ===
On June 1 during the Big Ideas Forum, a 24-year-old animal rights activist named Aidan Cook stole Sen. Kamala Harris's microphone while she answered a question about equal pay. Security officials and Harris's husband removed Cook from the stage. After the incident, Sen. Cory Booker told CNN he watched the video and was upset with the interference saying, "He crossed a line, this election's going to go on and I'm really hoping that we see Secret Service and others begin to step in because that really could have been a horrifying moment. Kamala's like a sister to me, I love her and that makes me very upset."

=== 2019 Second Step Presidential Justice Forum award ===
Sponsored by the 20/20 Bipartisan Justice Center, an alliance of Democrat and Republican African Americans seeking criminal justice reform, this presidential candidate forum was scheduled for October 25–27 at Benedict College in Columbia, South Carolina. On its first day, President Trump was presented the Bipartisan Justice award for his part in passing the First Step Act, following which Kamala Harris announced she was pulling out of the forum, which in turn prompted criticism from Trump. Mayor Steve Benjamin of Columbia (a co-sponsor of the forum) later announced that he had organized an alternative event called the Collegiate Bipartisan Presidential Forum, scheduled October 26–27, 2019, which Harris announced she would attend.
