= Michael C. Bender =

American writer and reporter

Michael Bender
- Born: c. 1978; Cleveland, Ohio, United States
- Education: Ohio State University
- Political party: Independent
- Spouse: Ashley Parker (m. 2018)
- Children: 3 daughters

Michael Charles Bender (born c. 1978) is an American writer and a political correspondent for The New York Times.

Born in Cleveland, Ohio, Bender was educated at Ohio State University, where he graduated with a degree in history in 2000.

Bender joined The Wall Street Journal in 2016. He was awarded the Gerald R. Ford Foundation Journalism Prize for Distinguished Reporting on the Presidency in 2019, and a National Press Club Award in 2020. In 2021, he published his first book, Frankly, We Did Win This Election. The book covers the events that led to President Donald Trump's loss of the 2020 presidential election to Joe Biden. The book was an instant New York Times best seller.

He married journalist Ashley Parker, White House reporter for The Washington Post, in 2018.

== Bibliography ==
- Bender, Michael C. (2021). Frankly, We Did Win This Election: The Inside Story of How Trump Lost
