= Ashley Parker =

American journalist

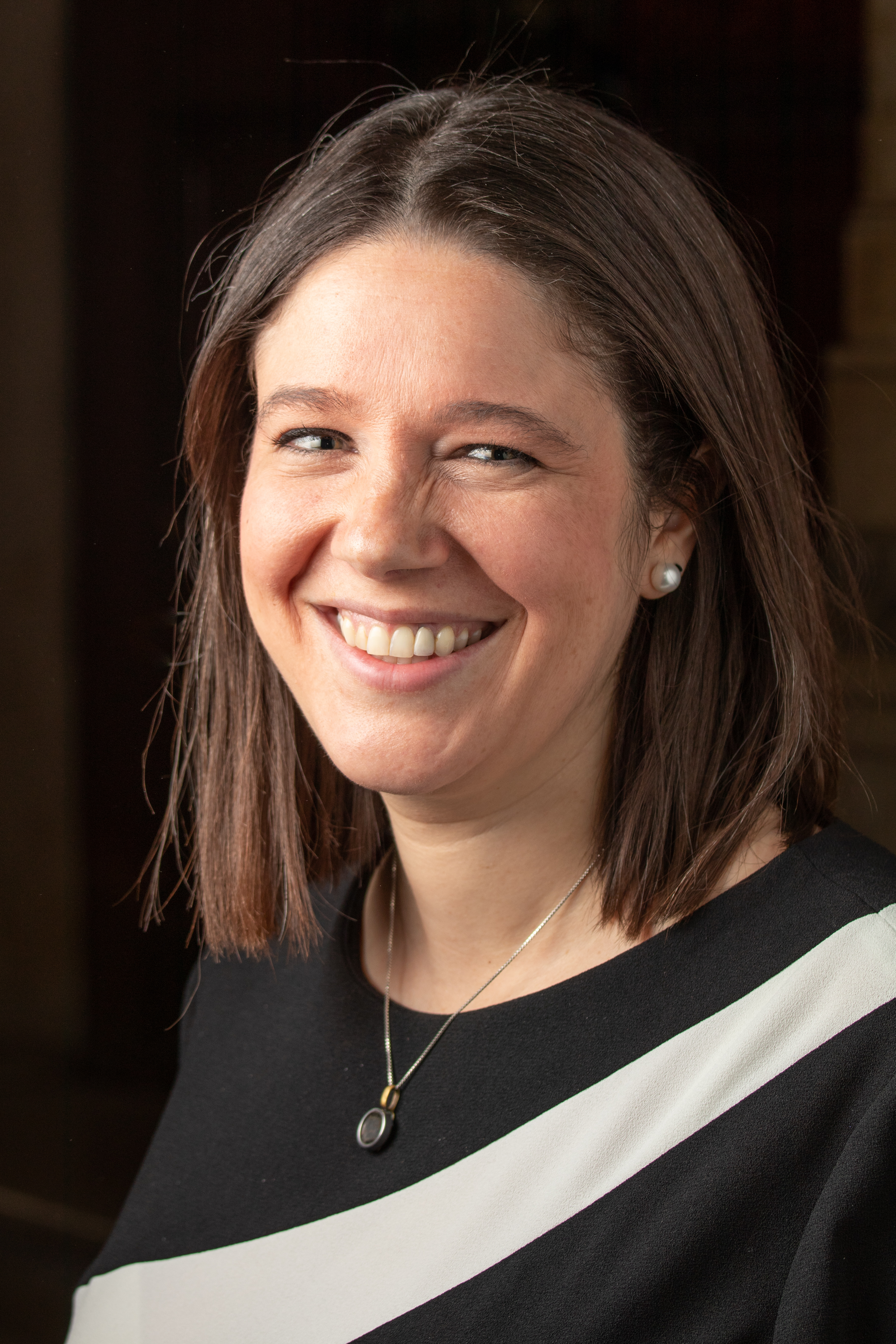
- Parker in 2018
- Born: c. 1983 (age c. 41); Bethesda, Maryland, United States
- Education: University of Pennsylvania (BA)
- Occupation: Journalist
- Employers: The New York Times; The Washington Post; MS NOW
- Spouse: Michael Bender (m. 2018)
- Children: 2
- Awards: Pulitzer Prize

Ashley Rebecca Parker (born c. 1983) is an American journalist, senior national political correspondent for The Washington Post, and senior political analyst for MS NOW. From 2011 to 2017 she was a Washington-based politics reporter for The New York Times. Jeffrey Goldberg, editor-in-chief of The Atlantic, announced that she would become a staff writer in mid-January 2025.

== Personal life ==
Parker was born and raised in Bethesda, Maryland, by Bruce and Betty Parker. Her father was a former president of Environmental Industries Association, a Washington, D.C.–based trade organization. She has lived in Bethesda for the majority of her life, except during her college years and a few years while working for The New York Times. Her immediate family still resides in the area.

She married Michael C. Bender, who was at the time a White House reporter for The Wall Street Journal, on June 16, 2018.

Parker and her husband have two daughters as Ashley returned to work from the birth of her 2nd daughter to the Post, in November of 2023. Her first daughter, Mazarine, was born in November 2018. Parker is a stepmother to Bender's daughter from a previous marriage.

== Education ==
Parker attended Bethesda's Walt Whitman High School, where she was a member of the class of 2001. She also spent part of her junior year at La Universidad de Sevilla in Spain and has a command of Spanish.

In 2005, she graduated summa cum laude from the University of Pennsylvania, where she majored in English (Creative Writing concentration) and Communications. She had been a Benjamin Franklin Scholar, and during her senior year, was awarded the Nora Magid Mentorship Prize in writing. Parker also completed internships with The New York Sun and the Gaithersburg Gazette, which is owned by The Washington Post. She served as a features editor and writer at both 34th Street Magazine and The Daily Pennsylvanian, the independent student newspaper for the University of Pennsylvania in Philadelphia.

== Career ==
After college at the University of Pennsylvania, Parker interned at the Gaithersburg Gazette and reported on local government, including city planning meetings.

She worked as a researcher for Maureen Dowd, a columnist for The New York Times.

She appeared and continues to appear on Washington Week on PBS, and she has also written for The New York Times Magazine. She covers many Republican Party candidates, elected officials, and topics as well as covering routine New York City topics and the White House. She also covered Chelsea Clinton's wedding for The New York Times.

Parker's photographs have appeared in Vanity Fair and her writing has appeared in other publications including The New York Sun, Glamour, The Huffington Post, Washingtonian, Chicago Magazine and Life magazine.

During the 2016 presidential campaign, Parker initially covered Jeb Bush's campaign before being moved to that of Donald Trump.

She and her Post colleague Philip Rucker shared the 2017 Gerald R. Ford Journalism Prize for Distinguished Reporting on the Presidency.

She was part of the reporting team at The Washington Post that, with The New York Times team, won the Pulitzer Prize for National Reporting in 2018 on coverage of Russian interference in the 2016 United States elections.

On September 7, 2019, Donald Trump called Parker and Rucker in a tweet "two nasty lightweight reporters" and called for banning them from the White House.

On November 20, 2019, Parker co-moderated the fifth Democratic Party presidential debate of the 2020 campaign, along with Rachel Maddow, Andrea Mitchell, and Kristen Welker.

In January 2021, she became The Washington Post White House bureau chief.

In 2021, Parker was a member of The Washington Post team that developed The Attack, a three-part online series that cited systematic security failures ahead of the January attack on the U. S. Capitol. The series won the 2021 George Polk National Reporting Award in Journalism.

On May 9, 2022, she was part of The Washington Post team that received the Pulitzer Prize for Public Service.

In July 2022, Parker became senior national political correspondent for The Washington Post. In December 2024, The Atlantic announced that Parker will be joining the magazine's staff as a writer.

Parker was part of the Washington Post team that won the 2024 Prize in National Reporting for its examination of the impact of the AR-15 semi-automatic rifle.
