= Brianne Pfannenstiel =

American journalist (born 1988)

- Born: 1988 (age 37–38); Kansas, U.S.
- Education: University of Kansas (BA)
- Occupation: Chief Politics Reporter at The Des Moines Register

Brianne Pfannenstiel (born 1988) is an American journalist who is the chief politics reporter for The Des Moines Register. Pfannenstiel co-moderated the seventh Democratic debate with Wolf Blitzer and Abby Phillip on January 14, 2020.

== Early life and education ==
Pfannenstiel was born in Kansas in 1988 to parents Peggy Jo and Pat. She attended the University of Kansas, graduating in 2010 with a degree in Journalism. On October 11, 2016, her mother died of cancer at the age of 54.

== Career ==
After graduating from the University of Kansas, Pfannenstiel worked as a reporter for The Kansas City Star and Lawrence Journal-World, where she covered the 2010 United States elections. She joined the Kansas City Business Journal in 2013. In 2015, she relocated to Iowa to join The Des Moines Register. In the 2016 Iowa caucus cycle, Pfannenstiel initially covered the Scott Walker campaign, followed by the Donald Trump campaign.

Pfannenstiel was selected Chief Politics Reporter for the 2020 United States presidential election. Pfannenstiel has been featured on C-SPAN, and appeared twice as a guest on At This Hour with Kate Bolduan.

After co-moderating the seventh Democratic debate, Pfannenstiel was listed by Vox as a "Winner" of the debate. Google searches for Pfannenstiel also increased 4,200 percent during the debate.
