= Wayne Messam =

American businessman and politician (born 1974)

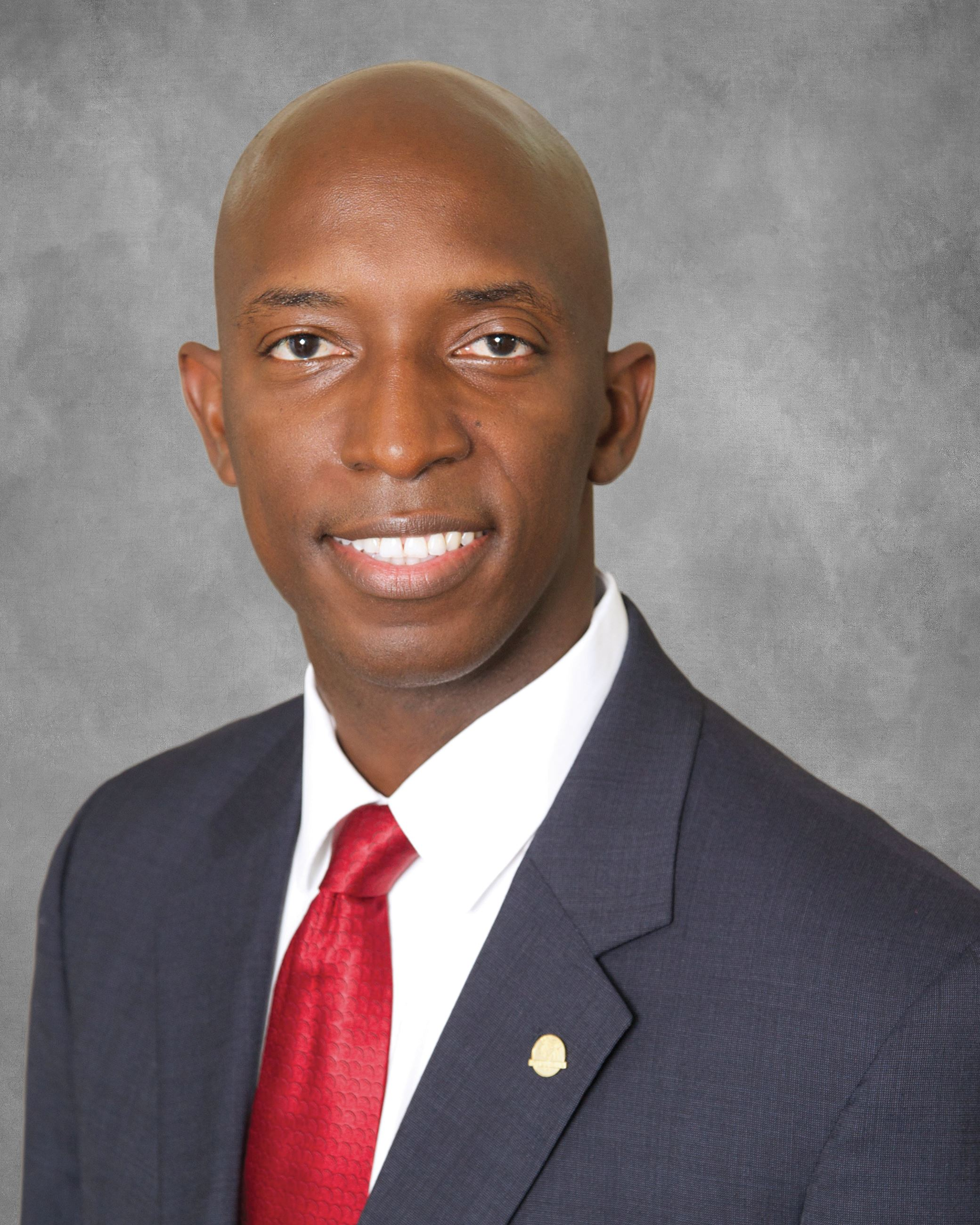

10th Mayor of Miramar
- Incumbent
- Assumed office April 1, 2015
- Preceded by: Lori Cohen Moseley

Member of the Miramar City Commission from the 4th district
- In office April 1, 2011 – April 1, 2015
- Preceded by: Yvonne Garth
- Succeeded by: Darlene Riggs

Personal details
- Born: Wayne Martin Messam; June 7, 1974 (age 52) South Bay, Florida, U.S.
- Party: Democratic
- Spouse: Angela Messam
- Children: 3
- Education: Florida State University (BS)
- Football career

No. 89
- Position: Wide receiver

Personal information
- Listed height: 6 ft 4 in (1.93 m)
- Listed weight: 208 lb (94 kg)

Career information
- High school: Glades Central High School
- College: Florida State
- NFL draft: 1997: undrafted

Career history
- Cincinnati Bengals (1997)*
- * Offseason or practice squad member only

Awards and highlights
- NCAA National Champion (1993)

Wayne Martin Messam (born June 7, 1974) is an American former football wide receiver, businessman, and politician serving as the mayor of Miramar, Florida, a position he has held since 2015. A member of the Democratic Party, he was first elected to the Miramar City Commission in 2011 before defeating incumbent mayor Lori Cohen Moseley in the 2015 election. Messam is also a general contractor and owner of a construction firm.

Messam ran for the Democratic nomination for President of the United States in the 2020 United States presidential election. He officially launched his campaign on March 28, 2019. He suspended his presidential campaign on November 20, 2019, having failed to qualify for any of the Democratic debates.

== Early life, education, and football ==
Messam was born in South Bay, Florida to Delsey and Hubert, who had both emigrated from Jamaica. When the family came to the United States, Hubert worked as a migrant farmer in the sugarcane fields of Florida's Glades region.

After graduating from Glades Central High School in Belle Glade, Florida, Messam attended Florida State University, where he played as a wide receiver for the Florida State Seminoles from 1993 through 1996. He was a member of the 1993 national championship team and caught 62 passes for 793 yards and four touchdowns during his college football career as a Seminole. Messam was also a member of the Florida State Seminoles track and field team and competed at the 1993 Atlantic Coast Conference indoor championships in the 55 meter hurdles. He graduated from Florida State in 1997 with a bachelor's degree in Management Information Systems.

After not being selected in the 1997 NFL draft, Messam signed with the Cincinnati Bengals as an undrafted free agent and was released on August 4 of that year.

== Career ==
Messam started a construction company in 2007. He was first elected to the City Commission of Miramar, Florida in 2011, and was elected as the city's mayor in 2015, defeating incumbent Lori Cohen Moseley and former vice mayor Alexandra Davis with 38.5% of the vote after vacating his commission seat. He won re-election on March 12, 2019.

Messam serves as president of the National Black Caucus of Local Elected Officials.

=== 2020 presidential campaign ===
In early 2019, some sources indicated that he was considering a bid for the Democratic presidential nomination in 2020, which he neither confirmed nor denied, stating that "all options will remain on the table." On March 13, 2019, he announced the formation of an exploratory committee for a potential run and formally announced his candidacy nine days later.

His campaign received $43,531 in campaign donations in the first quarter of 2019. In April, he was accused of failing to pay his staff. On June 28, he told Fortune Magazine that lack of money had kept his campaign from receiving national attention.

Messam's third quarter fundraising report initially declared that he had received only $5 in income, and had spent $0. Messam claimed that the low amounts were attributable to a "computer glitch." Messam later corrected these amounts to state that he had received $15,312 in income and spent $10,678 during the third quarter. His year-end quarterly reports showed that between the beginning of the fourth quarter and the end of his campaign, Messam received no money in contributions.

Messam suspended his presidential campaign on November 20, 2019. He did not qualify for any Democratic debate and was not classified as a "major candidate" by outlets such as FiveThirtyEight.

== Electoral history ==
All of the elections below were non-partisan.

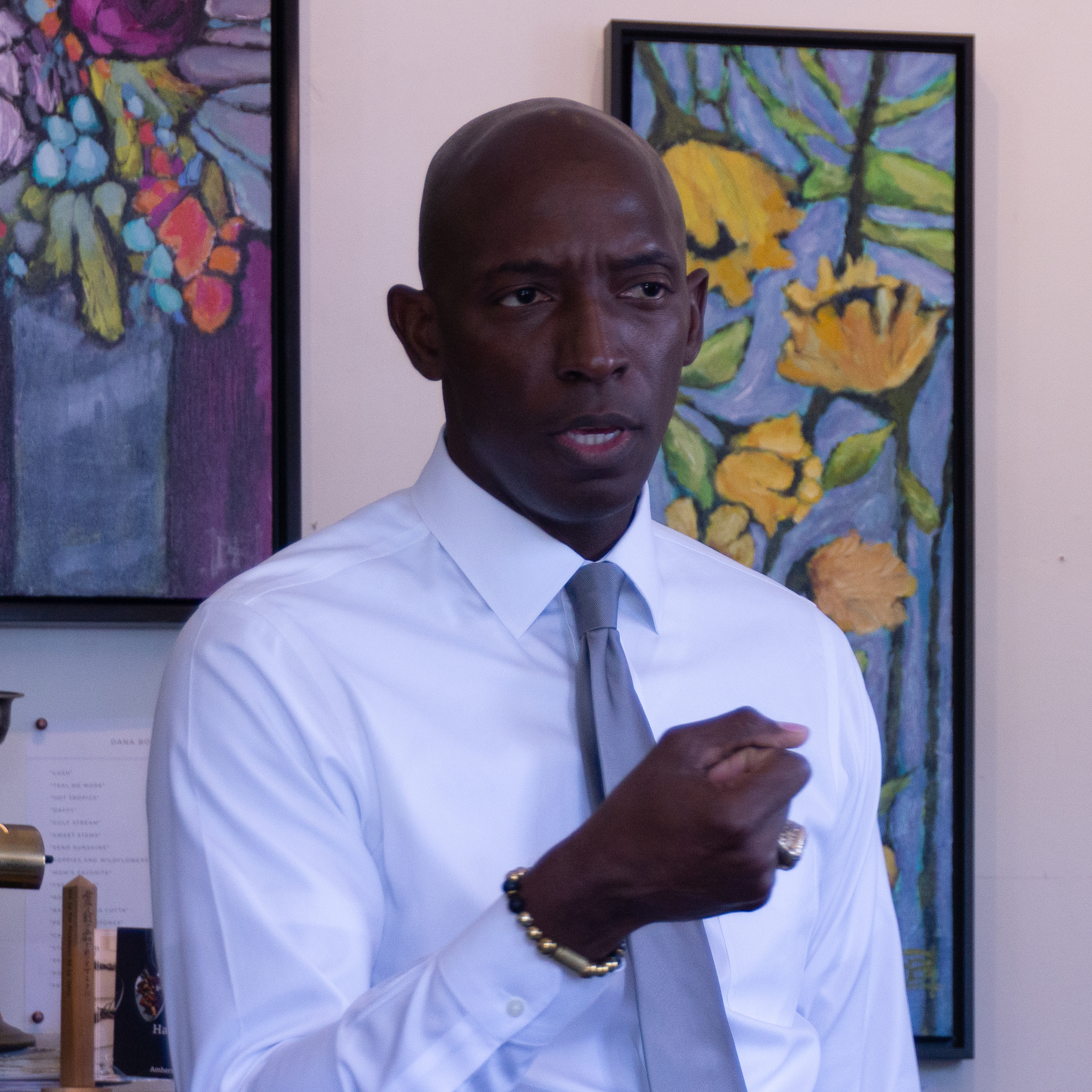
Messam in 2019

Miramar City Commission District 4, 2011
Candidate	Votes	%
Wayne M. Messam	1,120	37.69
Yvette Holt	1,087	36.57
Joe Romero	548	18.44
John J. Murphy Jr.	217	7.30

Miramar Mayor, 2015
Candidate	Votes	%
Wayne M. Messam	2,756	38.48
Lori Cohen Moseley (incumbent)	2,443	34.11
Alexandra P. Davis	1,964	27.42

Miramar Mayor, 2019
Candidate	Votes	%
Wayne M. Messam (incumbent)	5,847	86.05
Josue Larose	948	13.95

Miramar Mayor, 2023
Candidate	Votes	%
Wayne M. Messam (incumbent)	3,217	90.62
Rudy Theophin	333	9.38
