= Jay Inslee 2020 presidential campaign =

American political campaign

Jay Inslee for President
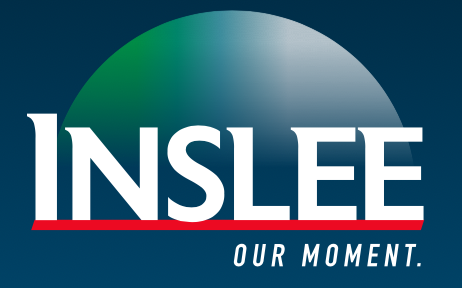
- Campaign: 2020 United States presidential election (Democratic Party primaries)
- Candidate: Jay Inslee: Governor of Washington (2013–2025); U.S. Representative from Washington (1993–1995, 1999–2012); Washington State Representative (1989–1993)
- Affiliation: Democratic Party
- Announced: March 1, 2019
- Suspended: August 21, 2019
- Headquarters: Seattle, Washington
- Key people: Aisling Kerins (campaign manager)
- Receipts: US$6,922,717.11 (September 2019)
- Slogan: Our Moment

Website
- jayinslee.com

The 2020 presidential campaign of Jay Inslee began on March 1, 2019, when Inslee – the incumbent Governor of Washington – announced that he would be running for the Democratic nomination. He had been chair of the Democratic Governors Association for the 2018 election cycle and served as a co-chair of the United States Climate Alliance. He was the first governor to enter the 2020 race.

Inslee centered his campaign around climate change and other environmental issues. His policy positions included transitioning the United States completely to zero-emission renewable energy by 2035, and investing in the creation of a clean energy economy and additional jobs. Inslee's campaign was officially suspended on August 21, 2019, when he announced his withdrawal from the race on The Rachel Maddow Show.

== Background ==
Throughout 2018, speculation rose that Inslee was considering a run for President of the United States in the 2020 election. He garnered national attention due to Washington v. Trump, a lawsuit challenging the Trump Administration's order to ban entry from seven Muslim-majority countries. While serving as chair of the Democratic Governors Association during the 2018 gubernatorial elections, Inslee oversaw Democrats gaining seven net governorships nationwide, further propelling him into the national spotlight and fueling speculation that he would run. Inslee cited climate change as his primary motivation for running, strongly criticizing the Trump Administration's policies.

On January 2, 2019, it was reported that Inslee was beginning to form an exploratory committee, the first step in a campaign. Inslee has pointed to former Presidents Jimmy Carter and Bill Clinton, saying that they were once "pretty much unknown governors of small states" and adding, "this is a wide-open field. No one has a lock on this. No one has a total crystal ball as to what the nation wants." On February 28, 2019, it was reported that Inslee had hired former advisors of Tom Steyer.

== Campaign ==
=== Announcement ===
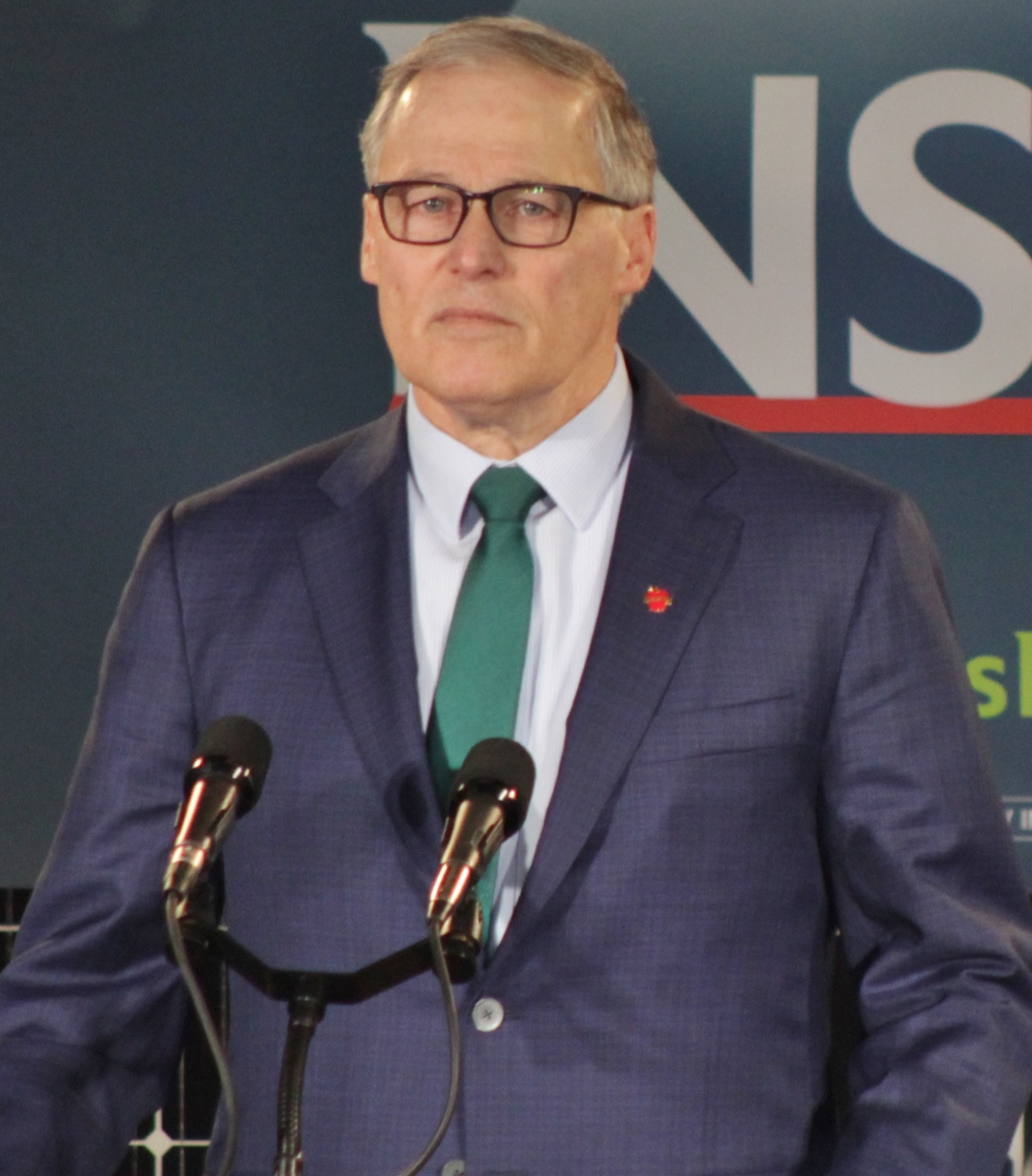
Inslee announcing his candidacy

On March 1, 2019, Inslee announced his presidential campaign bid at a solar panel provider's warehouse on Mount Baker in Seattle.

=== Events ===
On March 11, 2019, Inslee toured homes destroyed by the November 2018 Woolsey Fire, mocking President Donald Trump for suggesting that California could prevent wildfires by raking its forests.

=== Fundraising ===
On December 6, 2018, Inslee's Vision PAC reported $112,500 in donations from about two dozen contributors. On February 1, 2019, Vision PAC reported $243,000 in donations from about thirty contributors. A super-PAC called Act Now on Climate was launched on February 21, 2019, in anticipation of Inslee's presidential campaign.

According to Inslee's website, "Jay Inslee will not knowingly accept any contributions from the PACs, executives, or front groups of fossil fuel companies."

At the end of the second quarter, his campaign announced he had raised a total of $5.3 million since the campaign's launch on March 1, with an average donation of just below $32. He had also attracted 85,000 individual donors, as of the end of June.

=== Democratic presidential debates ===
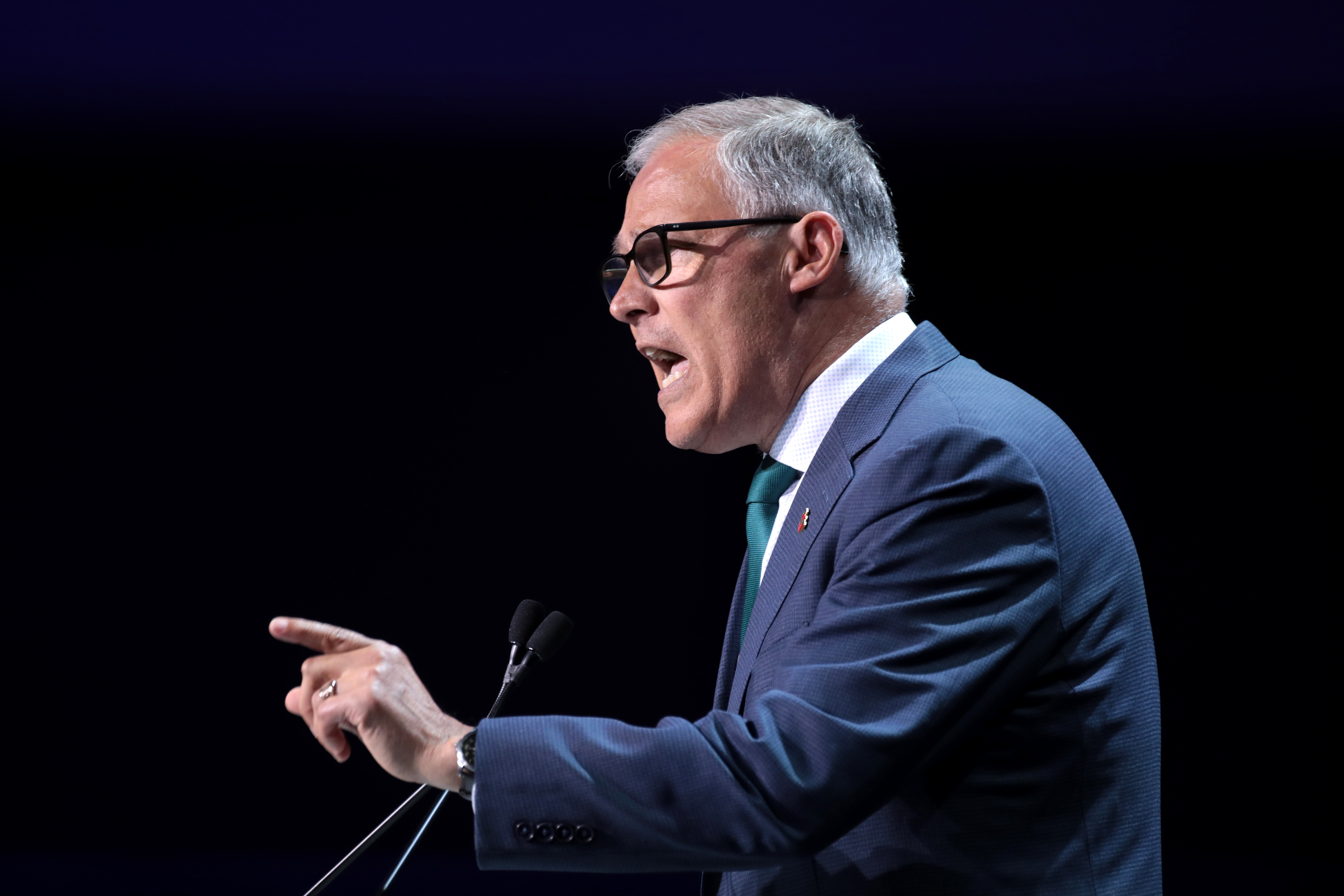
Inslee speaking to the California Democratic Party State Convention in June 2019

As of May 24, 2019, Inslee secured a place in the Democratic Presidential Debates by reaching the threshold of financial contributions from 65,000 individual donors and 1% support in DNC-approved polls needed for inclusion. He was the thirteenth candidate to "double qualify". Inslee subsequently requested that one such debate focus on climate change. In addition to rejecting the proposal, the Democratic National Committee reminded him that attempts to organize a debate privately would violate the exclusivity contract for candidates. This move was protested by Inslee and 53 members of the DNC.

=== Suspension ===
On August 21, 2019, during an interview on The Rachel Maddow Show on MSNBC, Inslee announced that he would drop out of the race. The next day he announced he would be seeking reelection for a third term as Governor of Washington in the 2020 gubernatorial election.

== Political positions ==
=== Climate change ===
Inslee made climate change the primary issue of his campaign, saying that it poses a "clear and present danger" to the country and comparing it to a terrorist threat. He strongly desired to transfer the United States away from the use of fossil fuels and towards the use of renewable energy.

On May 3, 2019, Inslee unveiled his "100% Clean Energy for America Plan", proposing zero-emission, renewable, and 100% clean energy nationwide by 2035. This plan was later adopted by Elizabeth Warren.

=== Economy ===
On May 16, 2019, Inslee unveiled his "An Evergreen Economy for America plan", with proposals involving investing roughly $9 trillion into jobs, clean energy, and modern infrastructure, in order to create 8 million jobs over the next ten years in the context of a clean energy economy. This plan included raising the federal minimum wage to $15/hour by 2024, pegged to median hourly wage thereafter, as well as introducing national paid sick leave.

=== Education ===
Inslee's education plan involved climate change, using the Department of Education to make new investments in STEM to help address the nation's technology concerns. Inslee also called for the retrofitting and upgrade of every U.S. school building within ten years, both to improve overall education infrastructure, and to prepare for the effects of climate change. He also pushed for large investments in mental health programs, universal preschool through age four, and free or reduced college tuition, reflecting the principles of the College Grant Program he implemented in Washington state. He also pushed for more equal access to education for disadvantaged populations, such as undocumented immigrants, DREAMers, and incarcerated persons.
