= 2020 Democratic Party presidential candidates =

Previous Democratic nominee
Hillary Clinton
Democratic nominee
Joe Biden

Candidates associated with the 2020 Democratic Party presidential primaries for the 2020 United States presidential election:

== Major candidates ==
Candidates who are on the ballot in a minimum of fifteen states. As of June 8, 2020, former Vice President Joe Biden became the presumptive presidential nominee by amassing enough delegates to secure the nomination. The nomination was made official at the 2020 Democratic National Convention in Milwaukee, Wisconsin.

=== Nominee ===
Name	Born	Experience	Home state	Campaign announced	Article	Ref.
Joe Biden	November 20, 1942 (age 77); Scranton, Pennsylvania	Vice President of the United States (2009–2017); U.S. senator from Delaware (1973–2009); Candidate for President in 1988 and 2008	Delaware	April 25, 2019	Campaign; FEC filing	

=== Withdrew during the primaries ===
Candidates who were major candidates who withdrew or suspended their campaigns after the Iowa caucuses or succeeding primary elections.

Candidate	Born	Experience	State	Campaign announced	Campaign suspended	Article	Refs
Bernie Sanders	September 8, 1941 (age 79); Brooklyn, New York	U.S. senator from Vermont (2007–present); U.S. representative from VT-AL (1991–2007); Mayor of Burlington, Vermont (1981–1989); Candidate for president in 2016	Vermont	February 19, 2019	April 8, 2020 (endorsed Biden)	Campaign FEC filing	
Tulsi Gabbard	April 12, 1981 (age 39); Leloaloa, American Samoa	U.S. representative from HI-02 (2013–2021) Member of the Honolulu City Council (2011–2012); Member of the Hawaii House of Representatives (2002–2004)	Hawaii	January 11, 2019	March 19, 2020 (endorsed Biden)	Campaign FEC filing	
Elizabeth Warren	June 22, 1949 (age 71); Oklahoma City, Oklahoma	U.S. senator from Massachusetts (2013–present)	Massachusetts	February 9, 2019; Exploratory Committee: December 31, 2018	March 5, 2020 (endorsed Biden)	Campaign; FEC filing	
Michael Bloomberg	February 14, 1942 (age 78); Boston, Massachusetts	Mayor of New York City, New York (2002–2013); CEO of Bloomberg L.P.	New York	November 24, 2019; Exploratory committee: November 21, 2019	March 4, 2020 (endorsed Biden)	Campaign; FEC filing	
Amy Klobuchar	May 25, 1960 (age 60); Plymouth, Minnesota	U.S. senator from Minnesota (2007–present)	Minnesota	February 10, 2019	March 2, 2020 (endorsed Biden)	Campaign; FEC filing	
Pete Buttigieg	January 19, 1982 (age 38); South Bend, Indiana	Mayor of South Bend, Indiana (2012–2020)	Indiana	April 14, 2019	March 1, 2020 (endorsed Biden)	Campaign FEC filing	
Tom Steyer	June 27, 1957 (age 63); Manhattan, New York	Hedge fund manager Founder of Farallon Capital, Beneficial State Bank, and NextGen America	California	July 9, 2019	February 29, 2020 (endorsed Biden)	Campaign; FEC filing	
Deval Patrick	July 31, 1956 (age 64); Chicago, Illinois	Governor of Massachusetts (2007–2015)	Massachusetts	November 14, 2019	February 12, 2020 (endorsed Biden)	Campaign; FEC filing	
Michael Bennet	November 28, 1964 (age 55); New Delhi, India	U.S. senator from Colorado (2009–present)	Colorado	May 2, 2019	February 11, 2020 (endorsed Biden)	Campaign; FEC filing	
Andrew Yang	January 13, 1975 (age 45); Schenectady, New York	Entrepreneur; Founder of Venture for America; Presidential Ambassador for Global Entrepreneurship (2015–2017)	New York	November 6, 2017	February 11, 2020 (endorsed Biden)	Campaign; FEC filing	

=== Withdrew before Iowa caucuses, but remained on ballots ===
Candidates who withdrew too late to remove their names from several state ballots and remained on at least two:

Candidate	Born	Experience	State	Campaign announced	Campaign suspended	Article	Ref.
John Delaney	April 16, 1963 (age 57); Wood-Ridge, New Jersey	U.S. representative from MD-06 (2013–2019)	Maryland	July 28, 2017	January 31, 2020 (endorsed Biden)	Campaign; FEC filing	
Cory Booker	April 27, 1969 (age 51); Washington, D.C.	U.S. senator from New Jersey (2013–present); Mayor of Newark, New Jersey (2006–2013)	New Jersey	February 1, 2019	January 13, 2020 (endorsed Biden, ran for re-election)	Campaign; FEC filing	
Marianne Williamson	July 8, 1952 (age 68); Houston, Texas	Author; Founder of Project Angel Food; Independent candidate for U.S. House from CA-33 in 2014	California	January 28, 2019; Exploratory committee: November 15, 2018– January 27, 2019	January 10, 2020 (endorsed Sanders, then Biden as nominee)	Campaign	
Julián Castro	September 16, 1974 (age 46); San Antonio, Texas	Secretary of Housing and Urban Development (2014–2017); Mayor of San Antonio, Texas (2009–2014)	Texas	January 12, 2019	January 2, 2020 (endorsed Warren, then Biden)	Campaign	
Kamala Harris	October 20, 1964 (age 56); Oakland, California	U.S. senator from California (2017–2021); Attorney General of California (2011–2017)	California	January 21, 2019	December 3, 2019 (endorsed Biden, who later chose her as vice presidential running-mate)	Campaign; FEC filing	
Steve Bullock	April 11, 1966 (age 54); Missoula, Montana	Governor of Montana (2013–2021); Attorney General of Montana (2009–2013)	Montana	May 14, 2019	December 2, 2019 (ran for U.S. Senate, endorsed Biden as nominee)	Campaign; FEC filing	
Joe Sestak	December 12, 1951 (age 68); Secane, Pennsylvania	U.S. representative from PA-07 (2007–2011); Former Vice Admiral of the United States Navy	Pennsylvania	June 23, 2019	December 1, 2019 (endorsed Klobuchar, then Biden as nominee)	Campaign; FEC filing	

=== Withdrew without appearing on primary ballots ===
Candidates who were major candidates who withdrew or suspended their campaigns before the 2020 Democratic primary elections began and were not on the ballot for the presidential primaries anywhere.

Candidate	Born	Experience	State	Campaign announced	Campaign suspended	Article	Ref.
Wayne Messam	June 7, 1974 (age 46); South Bay, Florida	Mayor of Miramar, Florida (2015–present)	Florida	March 28, 2019; Exploratory committee: March 13, 2019	November 19, 2019	Campaign; FEC filing	
Beto O'Rourke	September 26, 1972 (age 48); El Paso, Texas	U.S. representative from TX-16 (2013–2019)	Texas	March 14, 2019	November 1, 2019 (endorsed Biden)	Campaign; FEC filing	
Tim Ryan	July 16, 1973 (age 47); Niles, Ohio	U.S. representative from OH-13 (2013–2023); U.S. representative from OH-17 (2003–2013)	Ohio	April 4, 2019	October 24, 2019 (ran for re-election) (endorsed Biden)	Campaign; FEC filing	
Bill de Blasio	May 8, 1961 (age 59); Manhattan, New York	Mayor of New York City, New York (2014–2021)	New York	May 16, 2019	September 20, 2019 (endorsed Sanders, then Biden as presumptive nominee)	Campaign; FEC filing	
Kirsten Gillibrand	December 9, 1966 (age 53); Albany, New York	U.S. senator from New York (2009–present); U.S. representative from NY-20 (2007–2009)	New York	March 17, 2019; Exploratory committee: January 15, 2019	August 28, 2019 (endorsed Biden)	Campaign; FEC filing	
Seth Moulton	October 24, 1978 (age 42); Salem, Massachusetts	U.S. representative from MA-06 (2015–present)	Massachusetts	April 22, 2019	August 23, 2019 (ran for re-election) (endorsed Biden)	Campaign; FEC filing	
Jay Inslee	February 9, 1951 (age 69); Seattle, Washington	Governor of Washington (2013–2025); U.S. representative from WA-01 (1999–2012)	Washington	March 1, 2019	August 21, 2019 (ran for re-election) (endorsed Biden as presumptive nominee)	Campaign; FEC filing	
John Hickenlooper	February 7, 1952 (age 68); Narberth, Pennsylvania	Governor of Colorado (2011–2019); Mayor of Denver, Colorado (2003–2011)	Colorado	March 4, 2019	August 15, 2019 (ran for U.S. Senate) (endorsed Bennet, then Biden as presumptive nominee)	Campaign; FEC filing	
Mike Gravel	May 13, 1930 (age 90); Springfield, Massachusetts	U.S. senator from Alaska (1969–1981); Candidate for president in 2008; Candidate for vice president of the United States in 1972	California	April 2, 2019; Exploratory committee: March 19, 2019	August 6, 2019 (endorsed Gabbard and Sanders)	Campaign; FEC filing	
Eric Swalwell	November 16, 1980 (age 39); Sac City, Iowa	U.S. representative from CA-15 (2013–present)	California	April 8, 2019	July 8, 2019 (ran for re-election) (endorsed Biden)	Campaign; FEC filing	
Richard Ojeda	September 25, 1970 (age 50); Rochester, Minnesota	West Virginia state senator from WV-SD07 (2016–2019)	West Virginia	November 11, 2018	January 25, 2019 (ran for U.S. Senate; lost primary) (endorsed Biden)	Campaign; FEC filing	

== Other candidates ==
=== On the ballot in at least one state ===
Over 1,200 people filed with the FEC declaring that they were candidates; however, very few actually made the effort to get their names on the ballot anywhere. The following persons were listed on at least one primary ballot:

- Mosie Boyd, Arkansas
  Total votes: 2,062
- Steve Burke, New York
  Total votes: 252
- Nathan Bloxham, Utah
  Total votes: 69
- Jason Evritte Dunlap, Maryland
  Total votes: 12
- Michael A. Ellinger, California
  Total votes: 3,634
- Roque De La Fuente III‡, California
  Total votes: 13,584
- Ben Gleib, California
  Total votes: 31
- Mark Stewart Greenstein, Connecticut
  Total votes: 3,330
- Henry Hewes, New York
  Total votes: 315
- Tom Koos, California
  Total votes: 72
- Lorenz Kraus, New York
  Total votes: 52
- Rita Krichevsky, New Jersey
  Total votes: 468
- Raymond Michael Moroz, New York
  Total votes: 8
- David Lee Rice, West Virginia
  Total votes: 15,470
- Sam Sloan, New York
  Total votes: 34
- David John Thistle, Massachusetts
  Total votes: 53
- Thomas James Torgesen, New York
  Total votes: 30
- Robby Wells, Georgia
  Total votes: 1,960

‡Roque De La Fuente III is the son of perennial candidate Rocky De La Fuente and is not the same individual.

=== Not on the ballot anywhere ===
The following individuals who did not meet the criteria to become major candidates either formally terminated their campaigns or did not attempt to get on the ballot in a single contest:

- Harry Braun, renewable energy consultant and researcher; Democratic nominee for U.S. representative from AZ-01 in 1984 and 1986
- Ami Horowitz, conservative activist and documentary filmmaker (endorsed Donald Trump)
- Brian Moore, activist; Green nominee for U.S. Senate from Florida in 2006; Socialist and Liberty Union nominee for president in 2008
- Ken Nwadike Jr., documentary filmmaker, motivational speaker, and peace activist
- Scott Walker, Republican nominee for Delaware's at-large congressional district in 2018

== Declined to be candidates ==
These individuals had been the subject of presidential speculation, but publicly denied or recanted interest in running for president.

- Neil Abercrombie, former Governor of Hawaii (endorsed Biden)
- Stacey Abrams, former Georgia state representative; Democratic nominee for governor of Georgia in 2018 (endorsed Biden)
- Michael Avenatti, attorney from California (endorsed Biden)
- Tammy Baldwin, U.S. Senator from Wisconsin
- Richard Blumenthal, U.S. Senator from Connecticut since 2011
- Jerry Brown, former governor of California (Endorsed Biden)
- Sherrod Brown, U.S. Senator from Ohio (Endorsed Biden)
- Cheri Bustos, U.S. Representative from Illinois since 2013, former journalist and health executive
- Bob Casey Jr., U.S. Senator from Pennsylvania (endorsed Biden)
- Lincoln Chafee, Governor of Rhode Island 2011–2015; U.S. Senator 1999–2007; candidate for President in 2016
- Chelsea Clinton, First Daughter of the United States 1993–2001
- Hillary Clinton, former secretary of State, former U.S. Senator from New York, former first lady of the United States, presidential candidate in 2008, Democratic nominee for president in 2016 (endorsed Biden)
- George Clooney, actor, filmmaker, activist, businessman, and philanthropist from Kentucky
- Tim Cook, (Note: This individual is not registered to the political party of this section, but has been the subject of speculation and/or expressed interest in running under this party.) business executive, industrial engineer, and developer from California
- Stephen Colbert, comedian, television host, actor, and writer; candidate for President in 2008
- Roy Cooper, Governor of North Carolina (ran for re-election)
- Mark Cuban, businessman, investor, author, television personality, and philanthropist from Texas
- Andrew Cuomo, Governor of New York (endorsed Biden)
- Mark Dayton, former Governor of Minnesota
- Howard Dean, former Governor of Vermont, former DNC Chair
- Jamie Dimon, business executive from Illinois
- John Bel Edwards, Governor of Louisiana since 2016
- Rahm Emanuel, former mayor of Chicago, former White House Chief of Staff
- Russ Feingold, former U.S. Senator from Wisconsin
- Al Franken, former U.S. Senator from Minnesota
- Eric Garcetti, Mayor of Los Angeles, California (endorsed Biden)
- Andrew Gillum, former mayor of Tallahassee, Florida; Democratic nominee for governor of Florida in 2018
- Al Gore, former vice president of the United States; former U.S. Senator from Tennessee; Democratic nominee for president in 2000 (endorsed Biden)
- Luis Gutiérrez, former U.S. representative from Illinois
- Eric Holder, former United States attorney general
- Bob Iger, chairman and CEO of The Walt Disney Company
- Dwayne Johnson, actor and former professional wrestler
- Doug Jones, U.S. Senator from Alabama since 2018
- Tim Kaine, U.S. Senator from Virginia; former governor of Virginia; Democratic nominee for vice president in 2016 (endorsed Biden)
- Jason Kander, Secretary of State of Missouri 2013–2017; Democratic nominee for the U.S. Senate in 2016
- John Kasich, (Note: This individual is not a member of the Democratic Party, but has been the subject of speculation or expressed interest in running under this party.) former Governor of Ohio, former Representative from Ohio's 12th congressional district, 2016 Republican presidential candidate
- Caroline Kennedy, U.S. Ambassador to Japan 2013–2017
- Joe Kennedy III, U.S. representative from Massachusetts(ran for U.S. Senate) (endorsed Warren (candidate withdrawn))
- John Kerry, former secretary of State; former U.S. Senator from Massachusetts; Democratic presidential nominee in 2004 (endorsed Biden)
- Mitch Landrieu, former mayor of New Orleans; former lieutenant governor of Louisiana
- Sean Patrick Maloney, United States Representative for New York's 18th congressional district
- Terry McAuliffe, former governor of Virginia (endorsed Biden)
- William H. McRaven, United States Navy Admiral 1977–2014
- Jeff Merkley, U.S. Senator from Oregon (ran for re-election)
- Chris Murphy, U.S. Senator from Connecticut
- Phil Murphy, Governor of New Jersey (endorsed Booker (candidate withdrawn))
- Gavin Newsom, Governor of California (endorsed Harris (candidate withdrawn))
- Michelle Obama, former first lady of the United States from Illinois
- Martin O'Malley, former governor of Maryland; candidate for President in 2016 (endorsed O'Rourke (candidate withdrawn), then Biden)
- Ron Perlman, actor
- Gina Raimondo, Governor of Rhode Island (endorsed Bloomberg (candidate withdrawn), then Biden)
- Joe Sanberg, entrepreneur and investor from California (endorsed Sanders)
- Joe Scarborough, talk show host; former Republican U.S. representative from Florida
- Adam Schiff, U.S. representative from California (ran for re-election)
- Howard Schultz, former CEO of Starbucks from Washington
- Jon Tester, U.S. Senator from Montana (endorsed Bullock (candidate withdrawn))
- Richard Vague, businessperson, venture capitalist, author, and Secretary of Banking and Securities of Pennsylvania
- Mark Warner, U.S Senator from Virginia former Governor of Virginia (ran for re-election)
- Maxine Waters, U.S. representative from California (ran for re-election)
- Jim Webb, former U.S. Senator from Virginia, candidate for President in 2016
- Frederica Wilson, U.S. Representative from Florida since 2011
- Oprah Winfrey, television host and network executive from California
- Mark Zuckerberg, technology executive from California

== See also ==
- 2020 Republican Party presidential candidates
- 2020 Libertarian Party presidential candidates
- 2020 Green Party presidential candidates
- 2020 Constitution Party presidential candidates
- 2020 Minor party and independent presidential candidates
- Timeline of the 2020 United States presidential election
- Political positions of the 2020 Democratic Party presidential primary candidates
