= Portfolios with Purpose =

- Abbreviation: PwP
- Formation: 2011
- Type: Foundation
- Legal status: Non-Profit Organization
- Location(s): 295 Madison Avenue, 34th Floor New York, NY 10017 1-855-JOIN-PWP (564-6797)
- Executive Director: Brett Waikart
- Main organ: Board of Directors
- Staff: Volunteer Staff
- Website: portfolioswithpurpose.org

Portfolios with Purpose ("PwP") was a registered 501(c)(3) non-profit organization founded in 2011. It was a fantasy stock selection competition similar to fantasy sports leagues, but with all of the collected funds going to charity. The contestants with the top-performing portfolios over a 12-month period directed the sum total of the collected entry-fees to the charitable cause of their choice. Competitions were broken up into the categories of Novice, Professional and Master.

Novice: Open to the general public for a $100 entry fee.

Professional: Open to those in finance, as well as past Novice winners. $1,000 entry fee.

Master: Open to hedge fund managers and those of similar experience, as well as past Professional winners. $10,000 entry fee.

Those who won the Novice category often had the opportunity to meet with a member of the Master class.

A standout performer in this competition was Andy Nahas, who won the Professional competition in 2013, directing $33,000 to the Monroe Community Hospital, and placed 2nd in the Master competition in 2015, directing $56,250 to Reality Changers. Another standout was Brady Gariano, who netted a 196% return in 2020.

There were also notable charitable organizations, such as The Jeffrey Deskovic Foundation for Justice, a law firm specializing in freeing the wrongfully convicted.

In 2025 it was reported on Reddit that this contest led some to invest in the stock of The Federal National Mortgage Association, commonly known as Fannie Mae, which had a fast-rising stock price through the year.

== Operations ==
Portfolios with Purpose was an all-volunteer, non-profit organization overseen by a board of directors. Competitor stock portfolios were tracked, and progress was calculated daily. The contest's financial audits were prepared by Deloitte, and player's entry-fees were held in escrow at JPMorgan Chase. 100% of entry-fees net of credit card service charges were donated to the top 3 competitors' chosen charitable causes.

== Senior Management ==
Brett Waikart was the last executive director and president.

Former executives included Stacey Asher-Duran (Founding President), Joshua Williams (COO), Gabriel Pinar (COO), Christopher Pascale (CFO) and Jonathan Brand (CFO).

== Media coverage ==
After a year-long trial period, the public announcement of Portfolios with Purpose was conducted on June 20, 2012.

On September 6, 2012, Portfolios with Purpose announced the start of public registration, and the participation of several major hedge fund players: David Einhorn, Dan Loeb, Leon Cooperman, and Karen Finerman on the CNBC Fast Money Halftime Report.

Asher's professional background and the history of the formation of Portfolios with Purpose is detailed along with other notable public figures in Forbes magazine on December 1, 2012.

On December 19, 2013, Portfolios with Purpose announced the official launch of the 2014 Contest Year with several participating philanthropists. The Giving Pledge signatory Leon Cooperman, and Robin Hood Foundation board member David Einhorn both founding Portfolios with Purpose members announced their return to the contest. As well as James Dinan, Marc Lasry, Richard Pzena, and Doug Silverman.

== History ==
Portfolios with Purpose hosted its first stock picking contest for charity in 2013. 50 friends and family played the year-long contest of building a fantasy stock portfolio and selecting a charity to represent. Following the initial game's proof of concept, involvement and media attention increased. A board of directors headed up by Alexander Duran, and executive team was formed with Stacey Asher as president, Joshua Williams as COO, and Christopher Pascale as CFO. By 2017, over $2,000,000 was given to multiple organizations in more than 10 countries.

Following the founding board and executives' departures between 2015 and 2017, the organization changed directions to focus less on a stock picking contest, and more on outreach to under-served communities. According to its website, the "game" is no longer being played, and outreach has also ceased.
