= Pzena Investment Management =

American Investment Management Firm

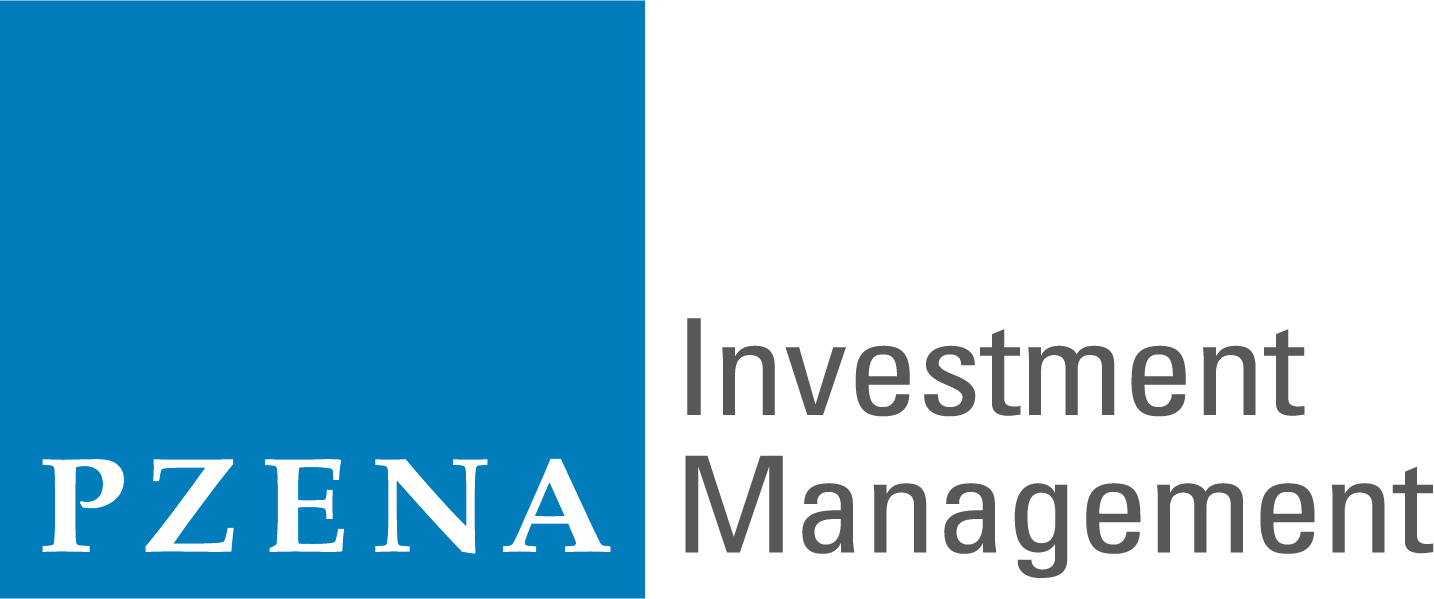
- Type: Private
- Industry: Investment management
- Founded: January 1996; 30 years ago
- Founder: Richard Pzena
- Headquarters: 320 Park Avenue, 8th Floor, New York, NY, United States
- Key people: Caroline Cai (CEO)
- AUM: US$85.6 billion (2025)
- Number of employees: 164 (2026)
- Website: www.pzena.com

Pzena Investment Management (Pzena) is an American investment management firm. Its expertise is in deep value investing. It oversees assets under management for institutions, High-net-worth individuals and mutual funds. The company is headquartered in New York City and has offices in London, Melbourne and Dublin.

== History ==
Pzena was founded in 1996 by Richard Pzena, who was Director of U.S. Equity Investments and Chief Research Officer at Sanford C. Bernstein. Pzena is known for managing value equities. Its investment strategies include large cap, emerging markets, European, global, and mid cap.

Despite under-performance during the bull market of the late 1990s, Pzena outperformed during the challenging market years of 2000–2002.

Pzena has subadvised John Hancock Financial's Classic Value fund since 1996. In 2002, John Hancock Financial acquired the Pzena's Focused Value Fund.

Vanguard has had a relationship with Pzena since 2005 where Pzena was selected to manage several of its funds. These include the Emerging Markets Select Stock Fund, Windsor Fund and Selected Value Fund.

In October 2007, Pzena filed an initial public offering to trade on the New York Stock Exchange (NYSE). It was the first investment company to go public that year "since the summer swoon rocked credit markets and impacted global stock markets."

On February 26, 2018, Pzena signed the United Nations Principles for Responsible Investment (PRI).

On July 27, 2022, Pzena announced that the firm entered into a transaction to delist from the NYSE to become a private company. The firm will do an all-cash share repurchase at $9.60 per share which was a 49% premium over the closing share price at the time. On October 10, Pzena received regulatory approval to complete the transaction to go private. On October 31, Pzena completed the transaction to delist from the NYSE and became a private company.

In 2023, Richard Pzena stepped down from managing the firm and was succeeded by Caroline Cai.
