= Leon Cooperman =

American businessman (born 1943)

- Born: April 25, 1943 (age 83); New York City, U.S.
- Education: Hunter College (BA); Columbia University (MBA)
- Occupations: Investor, hedge fund manager
- Known for: Starting Goldman Sachs's asset management arm Founding and leading Omega Advisors
- Spouse: Toby Cooperman
- Children: 2
- Website: https://www.omegaadvisers.com

Leon G. Cooperman (born April 25, 1943) is an American billionaire investor and hedge fund manager. He’s the chairman and CEO of Omega Advisors, a New York-based investment advisory firm managing over $3.3 billion in assets under management, the majority consisting of his personal wealth.

In September 2016 the U.S. Securities and Exchange Commission charged Cooperman and Omega Advisors with insider trading, more specifically for "trading stocks, bonds and call options of Atlas Pipeline Partners in July 2010 on information he obtained from an executive at the company". Cooperman's firm agreed to a $4.9 million settlement with the SEC in May 2017 but admitted no wrong-doing. As part of the settlement, Cooperman and Omega agreed to be subject to a compliance monitor with access to their electronic communications and trading records and to submit monthly certifications that they had not engaged in insider trading until 2022.

== Early life and education ==
Cooperman was born to a Jewish family in the South Bronx, New York City. He is the son of immigrants from Poland. Cooperman was the first in his family to earn a college degree. As an undergraduate at Hunter College, Cooperman joined and was an active member of the fraternity Alpha Epsilon Pi. After graduating, he became a quality control engineer at Xerox in 1965. Cooperman later received his MBA from Columbia Business School, graduating in 1967. He is also a Chartered Financial Analyst.

== Investment career ==
=== Early career and Goldman Sachs ===
Directly after graduating from Columbia, Cooperman joined Goldman Sachs. He spent his first 22 years at Goldman in the investment research department as partner-in-charge, co-chairman of the investment policy committee, and chairman of the stock selection committee. In 1989, he became chairman and chief executive officer of Goldman Sachs Asset Management and was chief investment officer of the equity product line including managing the GS Capital Growth Fund, an open-end mutual fund, for one and one-half years.

While at Goldman Sachs, Cooperman was voted the number one portfolio strategist in the Institutional Investor "All-America Research Team" survey for nine consecutive years.

At the end of 1991, after 25 years, Cooperman retired from his positions as a general partner of Goldman, Sachs & Co. and as chairman and chief executive officer of Goldman Sachs Asset Management.

=== Omega ===
After leaving Goldman Sachs, he organized a private investment partnership, Omega Advisors, Inc. Cooperman retired in 2016 and converted Omega to a family office.

=== 2016 SEC investigation ===
On September 21, 2016, Cooperman was charged with insider trading by the U.S. Securities and Exchange Commission. He denied the charges. Cooperman faced criminal charges in a related parallel proceeding and has asserted his Fifth Amendment right against self-incrimination before a SEC hearing. In May 2017 Cooperman's firm agreed to a $4.9 million settlement with the SEC. As part of the agreement, Omega Advisers admitted no wrongdoing. As part of the settlement, Cooperman and Omega agreed to ongoing compliance monitoring until 2022. The monitoring includes being subject to an onsite compliance monitor with access to their electronic communications and trading records. In addition, Cooperman and Omega must submit monthly certifications that they were not aware of material nonpublic information prior to any securities trades.

Following the settlement, Cooperman commented: "The process in my opinion was totally abusive. It's a problem that the government should address," and "My lawyers told me that the probability of my winning would be overwhelmingly high, that if I didn't win it had nothing to do with the merits of the case," he said. SEC officials declined to comment.

== Personal life ==
With his wife Toby, he has two sons, Wayne and Michael, and three grandchildren. Since the late 1970s, Cooperman has been a resident of the Short Hills neighborhood of Millburn, New Jersey, but he spends the majority of his time in Boca Raton, Florida. He has an honorary doctorate in finance from Roger Williams University in Rhode Island.

In 2012, Cooperman was included in the 50 Most Influential list of Bloomberg Markets magazine. Forbes listed Cooperman as one of the 40 Highest-Earning hedge fund managers in 2013. In the following year, the publication listed him among the top 25.

In 2026, Cooperman was ranked on Forbes' "Self-Made 250: The Greatest Living Self-Made Americans" list.

== Political and economic views ==
In recent years, Cooperman has primarily donated to Republican political campaigns.

In November 2011, Cooperman gained attention for an open letter to U.S. President Barack Obama in which among other things charged the president with engaging in class warfare.

In 2019, he criticized Democratic 2020 presidential candidate Elizabeth Warren's proposal to implement a wealth tax. He said it would lead to "unnatural acts, be near impossible to police, and is probably unconstitutional". He said that the stock market would drop by 25% if Warren was elected. In an interview on CNBC, Cooperman criticized the potential Warren wealth tax and its implications on his billion dollar fortune. His criticism of the hypothetical tax increase was then used as part of a Bernie Sanders 2020 presidential campaign advertisement.

During the January 2021 GameStop short squeeze, Cooperman appeared on CNBC to discuss the situation, angrily saying it was caused by "people sitting at home getting checks from the Government". The checks were part of the United States response to the COVID-19 pandemic. He also attacked President Biden, for whom he said he had voted, regarding potential capital gains tax increases, saying "the fair share is a bullshit concept" and "it was just a way of attacking wealthy people". CNBC later cut that portion of the video from their online article about his appearance.

In October 2023, Cooperman decided to stop donating to Columbia University amid student's protests of Gaza war, “We have one reliable ally in the Middle East — that’s Israel. We only have one democracy in the Middle East — that’s Israel, okay? And we have one economy tolerant of different people — gays, lesbians, etc. And that’s Israel,” Cooperman said while speaking on Fox Business's The Claman Countdown. Cooperman also called for the firing of Professor Joseph Massad who described Hamas’ deadly attack on Israel as “awesome” and “astounding”. He later said that "Columbia has been too slow to respond and to recognize these shitheads for what they are."

== Philanthropy ==
Signatories of The Giving Pledge, Cooperman and his wife joined the cause in 2010, which is a commitment by the world's wealthiest individuals and families to dedicate the majority of their wealth to charitable efforts.

Cooperman and his family committed $5 million in 2010 as a permanent fund intended to anchor activities supporting Jewish identity and continuity among young adults. The Cooperman Family Fund for a Jewish Future endowment of Birthright Israel, was the first endowment of this kind in the country.

Cooperman donated $25 million to his alma mater, Columbia Business School, in 2011. The donation was given to support the construction of new facilities in New York's Manhattanville neighborhood, including a new facility for Columbia's Graduate School of Business.

In April 2014, the Leon and Toby Cooperman Family Foundation pledged $25 million to the Saint Barnabas Medical Center for the construction of a new 200,000 square-foot Cooperman Family Pavilion.

In September 2021, the Leon and Toby Cooperman Family Foundation donated $100 million to the Saint Barnabas Medical Center which would be renamed to Cooperman Barnabas Medical Center.

Cooperman launched a scholarship funding program in 2015. The Cooperman College Scholars Fund assists high-achieving high school students pay for their college educations. At launch, the Cooperman College Scholars Fund partnered with four colleges and universities in New Jersey and Pennsylvania: The College of New Jersey, Rutgers, Rowan University, and Franklin & Marshall College.

He is also a founding Master Player of the Portfolios with Purpose virtual stock trading contest.

He serves as a board member for the Damon Runyon Cancer Research Foundation.

Cooperman is also a charitable member of the Songs of Love Foundation, a 501(c)(3) organization that records personalized music for those facing chronic illness. On June 7, 2017, Cooperman presented a One Million Dollar Four-Year Challenge Grant from The Leon and Toby Cooperman Family Foundation.
