= Political positions of the 2020 Democratic Party presidential primary candidates =

This page describes the stances held by Democratic candidates in the 2020 United States presidential election on a variety of policy issues (e. g., domestic and foreign issues). Only candidates still in the race during the 2020 Iowa caucuses are included.

== Domestic policy ==
=== Education ===
Candidate	Tuition-free public college	Debt relief for student loans	Affirmative action	Universal child care	Universal pre-kindergarten	Increase funding for primary and secondary public education
Michael Bennet	Partial (Note: Supports "debt-free 4-year college", and free community college)	No	?	Yes	Yes	Yes
Joe Biden	Partial (Note: Biden supports tuition-free community college and tuition-free four-year college for families with income below $125,000.)	Partial (Note: Supports debt forgiveness for teachers and other educators through the Public Service Loan Forgiveness Program)	Yes	Yes	Yes	Yes
Mike Bloomberg	Partial (Note: Supports tuition-free college for the "lowest-income students", and two-year public college tuition-free)	?	?	?	?	Yes
Pete Buttigieg	Partial (Note: Supports tuition-free college for "lower" and "middle-income families")	Partial	Yes	Yes	Yes	Yes
Tulsi Gabbard	Yes	Yes	?	Yes	Yes	Yes
Amy Klobuchar	Partial (Note: Supports tuition-free community college)	Partial	?	Yes	?	?
Deval Patrick	Partial	Yes	Yes	Yes	Yes	Yes
Bernie Sanders	Yes	Yes	Yes	Yes	Yes	Yes
Tom Steyer	Partial	?	?	?	?	?
Elizabeth Warren	Yes	Yes	?	Yes	Yes	?
Andrew Yang	Partial (Note: Supports tuition-free or "nearly free" community college)	Yes	Yes	Yes	Yes	Yes

=== Environmental issues ===
Candidate	Green New Deal	No Fossil Fuel Money pledge	Nuclear power to reduce emissions	Carbon tax	Paris Agreement	Ban fracking	Ban offshore drilling	Declare climate change a national emergency	End Fossil Fuel Extraction on Federal Land	End Fossil Fuel Subsidies
Michael Bennet	No	Yes	Yes	?	Yes	No	Partial (Note: Opposed to new offshore drilling operations)	No	?	?
Joe Biden	Partial (Note: Pushes the decarbonization deadline out two decades from 2030 to 2050)	Yes	Yes	Yes	Yes	No	Partial (Note: Will pursue an international ban of offshore drilling in the Arctic)	Yes	Yes	Yes
Mike Bloomberg	No	Yes	Open	Yes	Yes	No	No	?	?	?
Pete Buttigieg	Yes	Yes	Yes	Yes	Yes	Yes	?	?	Yes	Yes
Tulsi Gabbard	Yes	Yes	No	No	Yes	Yes	Yes	Yes	Yes	Yes
Amy Klobuchar	Yes	Yes	Yes	Open	Yes	No	?	Yes	Yes	Yes
Deval Patrick	?	No	Yes (Note: Under certain conditions)	?	Yes	?	?	?	?	?
Bernie Sanders	Yes	Yes	No	No	Yes	Yes	Yes	Yes	Yes	Yes
Tom Steyer	Yes	Yes	No	Yes	Yes	Yes	Yes	Yes	?	?
Elizabeth Warren	Yes	Yes	Unclear	Yes	Yes	Yes	Yes	Yes	Yes	Yes
Andrew Yang	Partial	Yes	Yes (Note: Seen as a Temporary Solution)	Yes	Yes	Partial	Yes	Yes	Yes	Yes

=== Gun control ===
Candidate	Universal background checks	Ban assault weapons	Gun buyback	Require gun license
Michael Bennet	Yes	Yes	Voluntary	No
Joe Biden	Yes	Yes	Voluntary	Partial
Mike Bloomberg	Yes	Yes	Voluntary	Yes
Pete Buttigieg	Yes	Yes	Voluntary	Yes
Tulsi Gabbard	Yes	Yes	Unclear	Unclear
Amy Klobuchar	Yes	Yes	Voluntary	Unclear
Deval Patrick	Yes	Yes	Voluntary	Yes
Bernie Sanders	Yes	Yes	Voluntary	Partial (Note: Only for assault weapons)
Tom Steyer	Yes	Yes	Voluntary	Yes
Elizabeth Warren	Yes	Yes	Voluntary	Yes
Andrew Yang	Yes	Yes	Voluntary	Yes

=== Health care ===
Candidate	Support single-payer health care system	Support public health insurance option	Eliminate private health insurance	Import prescription drugs from Canada
Michael Bennet	No	Yes	No	No
Joe Biden	No	Yes	No	?
Mike Bloomberg	No	Yes	No	Open
Pete Buttigieg	No	Yes	No	Yes
Tulsi Gabbard	Yes	?	No	Yes
Amy Klobuchar	No	Yes	No	Yes
Deval Patrick	No	Yes	No	?
Bernie Sanders	Yes	?	Yes	Yes
Tom Steyer	Yes	?	No	?
Elizabeth Warren	Yes	?	Yes	Yes
Andrew Yang	No	Yes	No	Partial

=== Immigration and border security ===
Candidate	Proposed Mexico–United States border wall	Trump travel ban	Support DACA	Allow more visa workers	Demilitarize Mexico–US border	Invest in ports of entry	Abolish ICE	Decriminalize illegal immigration
Michael Bennet	No	No	Yes	Yes	?	Yes	No	No
Joe Biden	No	No	Yes	Yes	?	Yes	No	No
Mike Bloomberg	No	No	Yes	?	?	Yes	?	?
Pete Buttigieg	No	No	Yes	Yes	Yes	?	No	Yes
Tulsi Gabbard	No	No	Yes	Yes	?	?	No	?
Amy Klobuchar	No	No	Yes	?	?	Yes	No	?
Deval Patrick	No	?	Yes	?	?	Yes	No	?
Bernie Sanders	No	No	Yes	?	Yes	Yes	Yes	Yes
Tom Steyer	No	?	?	?	?	?	?	?
Elizabeth Warren	No	No	Yes	?	?	?	No	Yes
Andrew Yang	No	?	Yes	Yes	?	Yes	No	Limited (Note: Legal mechanisms, provided by the Immigration and Nationality Act, should remain to combat drug and human trafficking. Other cases would not be criminally prosecuted.)

=== Technology ===
Candidate	Reinstate net neutrality	Treat private data as personal property	CASE Act
Michael Bennet	Yes	?	No
Joe Biden	Yes	?	?
Mike Bloomberg	?	?	?
Pete Buttigieg	Yes	?	?
Tulsi Gabbard	Yes	Yes	Yes
Amy Klobuchar	Yes	?	No
Deval Patrick	?	?	?
Bernie Sanders	Yes	?	No
Tom Steyer	Yes	?	?
Elizabeth Warren	Yes	?	No
Andrew Yang	Yes	Yes	?

== Economy ==
=== Economics ===
Candidate	Estate tax	Postal banking	Reparations for slavery	Wealth tax	Breaking up the largest banks	Support NAFTA
Michael Bennet	Yes	?	?	?	No	?
Joe Biden	Yes	?	Partial (Note: Supports a commission that determines what form reparations could take)	No	?	Yes
Mike Bloomberg	?	?	?	Yes (Note: Proposed a 5% surtax on incomes over $5 million per annum, but said that Warren's plan was potentially unconstitutional, and compared it to Venezuelan socialism)	?	Yes
Pete Buttigieg	Yes	?	Partial (Note: Supports H.R. 40)	Yes	?	No
Tulsi Gabbard	Yes	?	Yes	?	Yes	No
Amy Klobuchar	Yes	?	Partial	?	?	?
Deval Patrick	Yes	?	?	No	?	?
Bernie Sanders	Yes	Yes	Partial	Yes	Yes	No
Tom Steyer	?	?	Yes	Yes	?	?
Elizabeth Warren	Yes	Yes	Yes	Yes	Yes	?
Andrew Yang	Yes	Yes	Partial	No	?	?

=== Labor and welfare issues ===
Candidate	Raise minimum wage	Basic income	Paid family leave	Paid sick leave	Limit right-to-work laws	Job guarantee
Michael Bennet	$12 (Note: Supports the federal minimum wage being $12, and a $15 minimum wage being implemented in "high-cost cities")	?	Yes	Yes	?	?
Joe Biden	$15	No	Yes	Yes	Yes	?
Mike Bloomberg	$15	?	Yes	Yes	?	?
Pete Buttigieg	$15	Partial	Yes	?	Yes	?
Tulsi Gabbard	$15	Yes	Yes	Yes	Yes	No
Amy Klobuchar	$15	?	Yes	Yes	Yes	?
Deval Patrick	?	?	Yes	Yes	?	?
Bernie Sanders	$15	No	Yes	Yes	Yes	Yes
Tom Steyer	$22	?	?	?	?	?
Elizabeth Warren	$15	Open	Yes	Yes	Yes	Partial
Andrew Yang	No (Note: Pushes for a Basic Income, as opposed to a livable wage, although Yang states that whether states should increase minimum wage or not depends on economy and budget)	Yes	Yes	?	Yes	No

== Foreign policy and national security ==
=== Foreign policy ===
Candidate	Pardon Julian Assange	Rejoin the Iran nuclear deal	Recognize Juan Guaidó as interim President of Venezuela	Two-state solution for the Israeli–Palestinian conflict	Leveraging aid to Israel	Use tariffs against China	Meet directly with North Korea's Kim Jong-un	Resume diplomatic relations with Syria's President Bashar al-Assad
Michael Bennet	No	Yes	?	?	?	No	Partial (Note: Only with preconditions)	?
Joe Biden	No	Yes	Yes	Yes	No	Unclear	Partial	Unclear
Mike Bloomberg	?	Yes (Note: Criticized the JCPOA, but also criticized Trump's withdrawal. Says he would "re-enter the deal with no new preconditions". Spokesman adds that he would "re-establish the coalition" that imposed sanctions and negotiated the JCPOA, insist that "Iran must come back into compliance with the JCPOA requirements", and "also be ready to address other inadequacies in the deal")	?	?	No	?	?	?
Pete Buttigieg	No	Yes	Yes	Yes	?	Yes	Partial	No
Tulsi Gabbard	Yes	Yes	No	Yes	?	No	Yes	Yes
Amy Klobuchar	No	Yes	?	?	?	Yes	Partial	?
Deval Patrick	?	?	?	?	?	?	?	?
Bernie Sanders	Unclear	Yes	No (Note: Has called for "international and regional cooperation for free elections in Venezuela")	Yes	Yes	Yes	Yes	Open
Tom Steyer	No	?	?	?	?	?	?	No
Elizabeth Warren	No	Yes	?	?	?	Yes	Partial	No (Note: "Assad has got to go")
Andrew Yang	No	Yes	Yes	Yes	No	Temporary (Note: Tariffs will not be repealed immediately until a deal is made with China)	Yes	Open

=== Defense ===
Candidate	Withdraw troops from Afghanistan	Intervention in Syria	Military Intervention in Venezuela	Intervention in Yemen	Defend Taiwan	Drone strikes	Decrease the annual military budget
Michael Bennet	By end of 1st term	?	?	No	?	?	No
Joe Biden	By end of 1st term	Yes	No	No	?	Yes	No
Mike Bloomberg	?	?	?	?	?	?	?
Pete Buttigieg	1st year	Yes	No	No	?	?	No
Tulsi Gabbard	1st year	No	No	No	?	Limited	Yes
Amy Klobuchar	By end of 1st term	Yes	?	No	?	?	Yes
Deval Patrick	?	?	?	?	?	?	?
Bernie Sanders	By end of 1st term	No	No	No	Yes	Limited	Yes
Tom Steyer	?	?	?	No	?	?	Yes
Elizabeth Warren	By end of 1st term	Unclear	No	No	?	?	Yes
Andrew Yang	By end of 1st term	?	No	No	?	?	Yes

== Government ==
=== Electoral and institutional reform ===
Candidate	Abolish the Electoral College	Abolish the filibuster	Adoption of IRV/RCV	Ban voter ID laws	D. C. statehood	Puerto Rico statehood	End felony disenfranchisement after imprisonment	Expand / reform Supreme Court	Make Election Day a federal holiday	Lower voting age to 16
Michael Bennet	Yes	No	?	?	Yes	Open	Yes	No	?	?
Joe Biden	No	No	?	Yes	Yes	Yes	Yes	No	?	?
Mike Bloomberg	?	Yes	?	?	?	Yes	?	?	?	?
Pete Buttigieg	Yes	Yes	Yes	Yes	Yes	Yes	Yes	Yes	Yes	?
Tulsi Gabbard	Open (Note: Supports electoral college reform)	Open	Yes	Yes	Yes	Yes	Yes	?	Yes	?
Amy Klobuchar	Open	Open	?	Yes	Yes	Yes	Yes	?	Yes	?
Deval Patrick	Yes	?	?	?	?	?	?	?	?	?
Bernie Sanders	Yes	Open	Yes	Yes	Yes	Open (Note: Supports a process of self-determination where Puerto Ricans decide the nature of their relationship with the US)	Yes	Yes (Note: Impose term limits for Supreme Court justices, opposed to expanding the number of justices)	Yes	Open
Tom Steyer	?	Yes	?	?	?	?	Yes	?	?	?
Elizabeth Warren	Yes	Yes	Open	?	Yes	Open	Yes	Yes	Yes	?
Andrew Yang	No	Yes	Yes	?	Yes	Yes	Yes	Yes (Note: Impose term limits for Supreme Court justices)	Yes	Yes

=== Campaign finance ===
Candidate	No corporate PAC donations	Overturn Citizens United	Publicly funded elections	Democracy vouchers	We the People Amendment	Fundraising from billionaires?
Michael Bennet	Yes	Yes	?	?	?	?
Joe Biden	No	Yes	Yes	?	?	Yes
Mike Bloomberg	Yes	?	?	?	?	Yes (Note: Self-funding campaign)
Pete Buttigieg	Yes	Yes	Yes	?	?	Yes
Tulsi Gabbard	Yes	Yes	Yes	Yes	Yes	?
Amy Klobuchar	Yes	Yes	Yes	?	?	?
Deval Patrick	No	Yes	?	?	?	?
Bernie Sanders	Yes	Yes	Yes	Yes	Yes	No
Tom Steyer	Yes	Yes	?	?	?	?
Elizabeth Warren	Yes	Yes	Yes	?	?	Partial (Note: Accepts contributions from billionaires, does not hold high-dollar fundraisers)
Andrew Yang	Yes	Yes	Yes	Yes	?	?

== Social issues ==
=== Abortion ===
Candidate	Support right to abortion	Contraceptive mandate	Fund Planned Parenthood	Abolish the Hyde Amendment
Michael Bennet	Yes	Yes	Yes	Yes
Joe Biden	Yes	?	Yes	Yes (Note: Biden formally declared his support for the Hyde amendment, before later dropping his support following controversy)
Mike Bloomberg	Yes	?	Yes	Yes
Pete Buttigieg	Yes	?	Yes	Yes
Tulsi Gabbard	Yes	Yes	Yes	Yes
Amy Klobuchar	Yes	Yes	Yes	Yes
Deval Patrick	Yes	?	Yes	?
Bernie Sanders	Yes	Yes	Yes	Yes
Tom Steyer	Yes	?	?	?
Elizabeth Warren	Yes	Yes	Yes	Yes
Andrew Yang	Yes	Yes	Yes	Yes

=== Criminal justice ===
Candidate	Legalize and regulate all illicit drugs	End capital punishment	Legalization of marijuana	Expunging cannabis conviction records	End cash bail	Abolish private prisons	End mandatory minimum sentencing for non-violent drug offenses	Job placement services for released offenders	Decriminalization of prostitution
Michael Bennet	No	Yes	Yes	Yes	No	?	Yes	?	?
Joe Biden	No	Yes	Partial (Note: Supports decriminalization at federal level, rescheduling marijuana from Schedule I to Schedule II, and allowing "states to continue to make their own choices regarding legalization".)	Yes	Yes	Yes	Yes	Yes	?
Mike Bloomberg	No	Yes	Yes (Note: Wants to decriminalize the use and possession of marijuana nationwide)	Yes	Yes	?	Yes	?	No
Pete Buttigieg	Partial (Note: Endorses simply decriminalizing possession of all drugs)	Yes	Yes	Yes	Yes	Yes	Yes	?	?
Tulsi Gabbard	Yes	Yes	Yes	Yes	Yes	Yes	Yes	?	Yes
Amy Klobuchar	No	Yes	Partial (Note: Supports legalization at the federal level, but believes states should decide at the state level)	?	Partial	?	Partial	?	No
Deval Patrick	No	Yes	?	?	?	Yes	Yes	?	?
Bernie Sanders	No	Yes	Yes	Yes	Yes	Yes	Yes	?	Open
Tom Steyer	No	Yes	Yes	?	Yes	?	?	?	?
Elizabeth Warren	No	Yes	Yes	Yes	Yes	Yes	Partial	?	Open
Andrew Yang	Partial (Note: Supports decriminalizing opioids; funding safe consumption sites for illegal drugs; and making psychedelic mushrooms "more freely available")	Yes	Yes	Yes	Partial (Note: Wants to reduce the use of cash bail)	Yes	?	?	Partial

=== LGBT+ issues ===
Candidate	Equality Act	Same-sex marriage	Transgender military service
Michael Bennet	Yes	Yes	Yes
Joe Biden	Yes	Yes	Yes
Mike Bloomberg	Yes	Yes	Yes
Pete Buttigieg	Yes	Yes	Yes
Tulsi Gabbard	Yes	Yes	Yes
Amy Klobuchar	Yes	Yes	Yes
Deval Patrick	?	Yes	?
Bernie Sanders	Yes	Yes	Yes
Tom Steyer	Yes	Yes	Yes
Elizabeth Warren	Yes	Yes	Yes
Andrew Yang	Yes	Yes	Yes

== Candidate solidarity ==
=== Pledge to support eventual nominee ===
Candidates have been encouraged by organisations, namely Indivisible Project and Individual Action, to take a pledge of unity, known as "We Are Indivisible". This means supporting the eventual Democratic nominee, should the candidate's own nomination be unsuccessful. The stance of each candidate is stated as follows:

Candidate	Took the pledge
Michael Bennet	Yes
Joe Biden	Yes
Mike Bloomberg	Yes
Pete Buttigieg	Yes
Tulsi Gabbard	No
Amy Klobuchar	Yes
Deval Patrick	No
Bernie Sanders	Yes
Tom Steyer	Yes
Elizabeth Warren	Yes
Andrew Yang	Yes
