= Beto O'Rourke 2020 presidential campaign =

American political campaign

- Campaign: 2020 United States presidential election
- Candidate: Beto O'Rourke; U.S. Representative from Texas (2013–2019)
- Affiliation: Democratic Party
- Announced: March 14, 2019
- Suspended: November 1, 2019
- Headquarters: El Paso, Texas
- Key people: Jen O'Malley Dillon (campaign manager)
- Receipts: US$18,469,515.88 (12/31/2019)
- Slogan(s): Beto For America, Beto For All

Website
- www.betoorourke.com

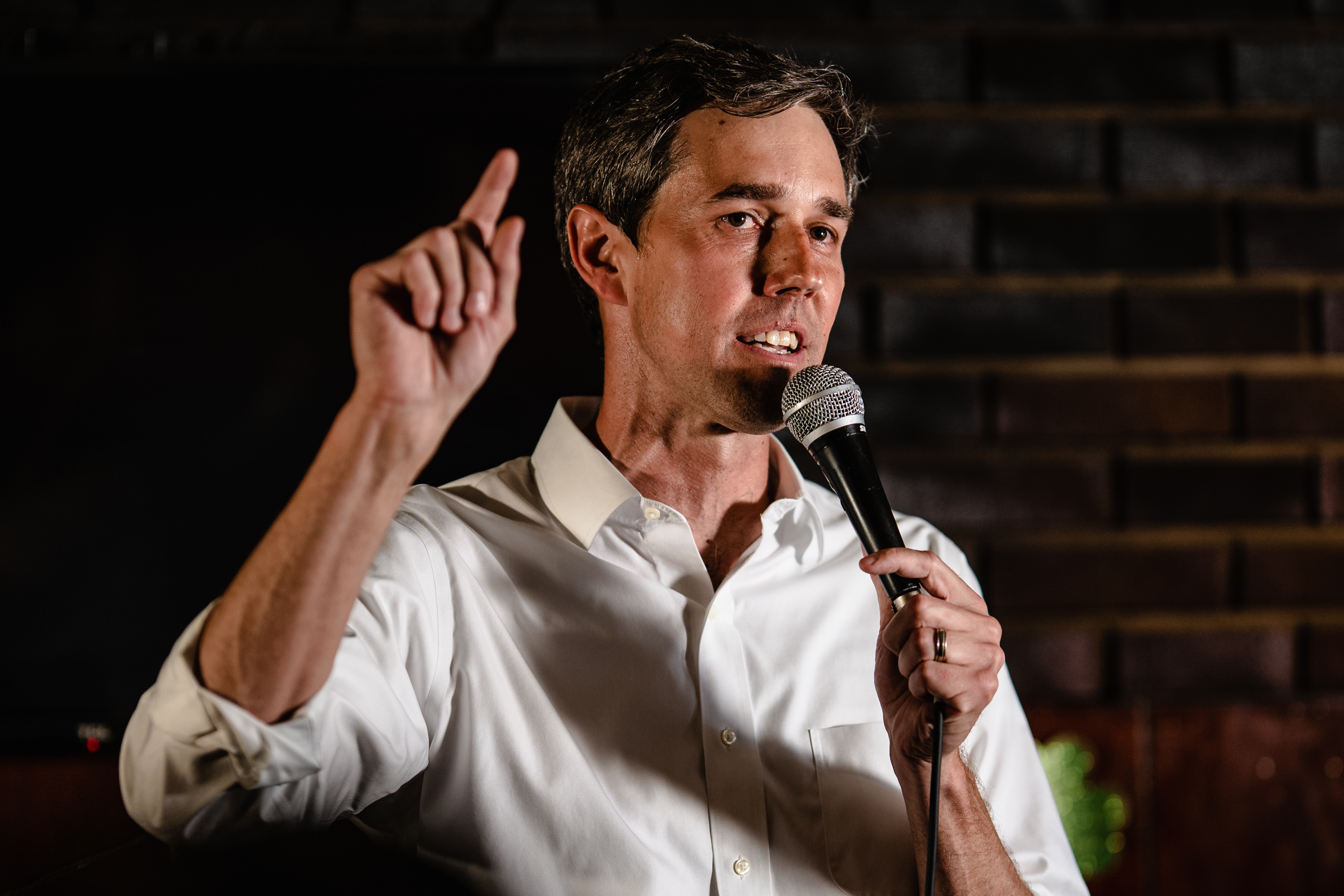
O'Rourke campaigning in Ohio in March 2019

The 2020 presidential campaign of Beto O'Rourke, the U.S. representative for Texas's 16th congressional district from 2013 to 2019, was announced on March 14, 2019. Beto O'Rourke had previously attracted national attention for his unsuccessful campaign against Ted Cruz in the 2018 Senate election in Texas.

O'Rourke's major policy positions include a public option for healthcare, universal background checks for firearm purchases and a ban on assault weapons for personal sale or use, increasing the federal minimum wage to $15 an hour, a universal pre-kindergarten program, federal legalization of recreational marijuana, and removing tax-exempt status of religious organizations that oppose same-sex marriage. He does not support mandatory single-payer healthcare.

O'Rourke suspended his campaign on November 1, 2019, following a failure to gain significant support and financial constraints. On March 2, 2020, O’Rourke endorsed Joe Biden after Pete Buttigieg and Amy Klobuchar officially endorsed him.

== Background ==
O'Rourke gained prominence on the national stage for challenging incumbent Republican Senator Ted Cruz in the 2018 Senate election in Texas. He lost by a margin of less than three percent, making the race one of the tightest that year. His Senate campaign earned him a reputation as an effective fundraiser; he raised more than $38 million in the third quarter of 2018 alone, about three times as much as Cruz raised during the same period, and had raised a total of about $80 million throughout his campaign. His $80 million haul is the highest amount of money ever raised by a Senate candidate to date.

In late 2018, speculation began that O'Rourke might run in the 2020 United States presidential election. Before the midterm elections, The New Republic claimed that O'Rourke's Senate campaign was laying the groundwork for a potential presidential bid, especially since he was likely to lose his Senate race. However, O'Rourke had repeatedly ruled out a presidential bid when asked on the campaign trail. He told MSNBC, "I will not be a candidate for president in 2020. That’s, I think, as definitive as those sentences get."

After losing the Senate race in Texas, O'Rourke mentioned at a town hall meeting that he and his wife had made a decision not to rule anything out. Meanwhile, CNBC reported that O'Rourke's senatorial campaign team had held discussions with senior operatives who worked on former President Barack Obama's campaign as O'Rourke considered a run for the presidency.

== Campaign ==
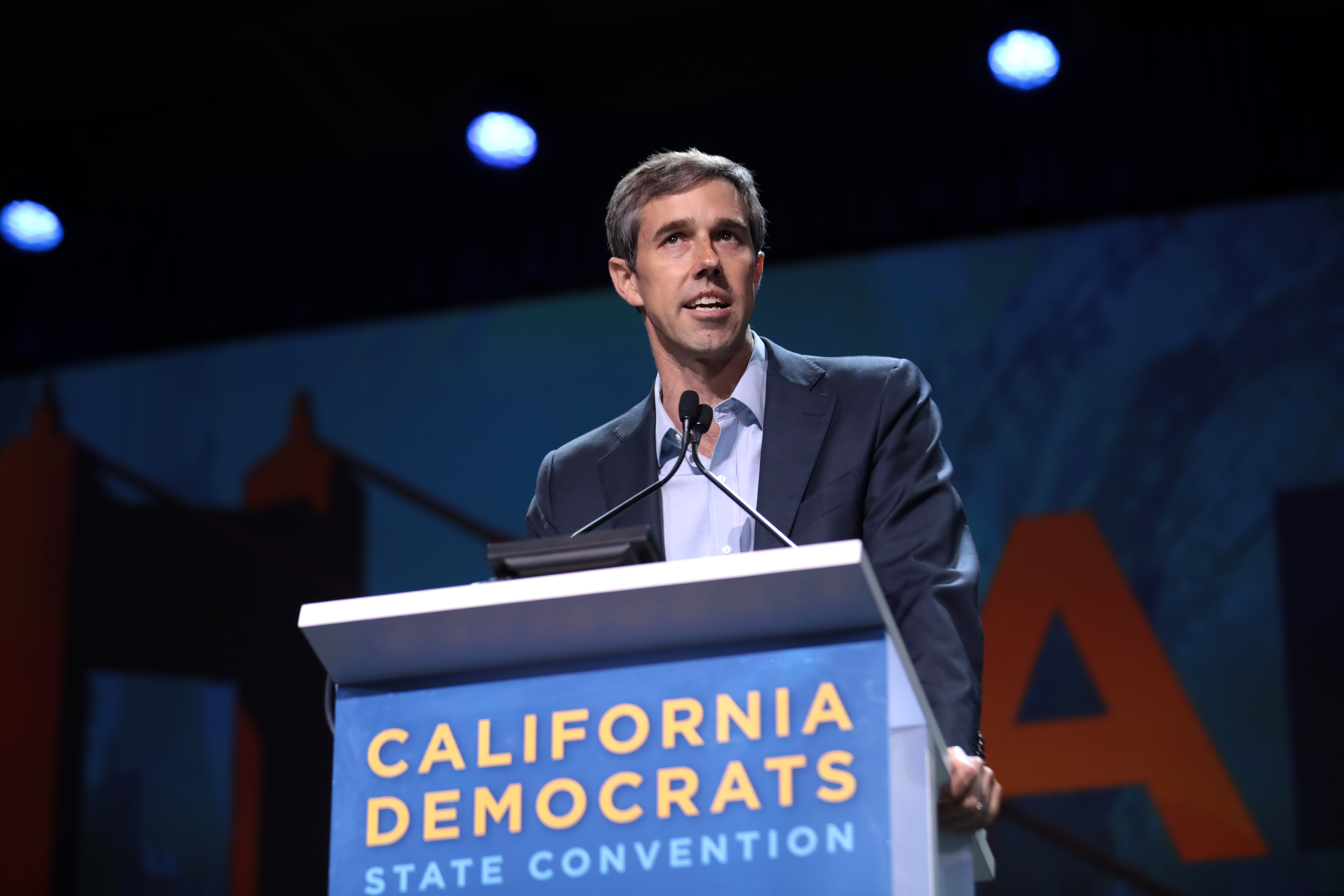
O'Rourke speaking to the California Democratic Party State Convention in June 2019.

=== Announcement ===
On March 14, 2019, O’Rourke officially announced that he is running for president for the 2020 election. The first outlet confirming his announcement was KTSM-TV, El Paso's local NBC-affiliated TV station, where his former brother-in-law was once the news director.

=== Speaking events ===
On April 12, O'Rourke held a rally in the gym of H.E. McCracken Middle School in Bluffton, South Carolina where he stated that the United States could have border security through "treating people with respect and dignity" rather than through President Trump's US–Mexico border wall, and accused Trump of trying to divide America.

On April 27, O'Rourke held a rally at Los Angeles Trade-Technical College where he delivered condolences for the Poway synagogue shooting that occurred hours earlier and pledged that they would support their words with actions to ensure that "in this country that sees more than 30,000 gun deaths every year, a rate not seen anywhere else in the world, that we will insist on universal background checks for everyone, without loopholes or exceptions."

On April 28, O'Rourke held a town hall at the United Irish Cultural Center in San Francisco, California where he reflected on the two weeks that San Franciscans spent "wearing masks on their face last year because of the smoke that came here from wildfires that raged at historic levels" and said that he would block the Keystone XL Tar Sands pipeline as president.

On May 21, O'Rourke participated in a CNN town hall moderated by Dana Bash. According to Nielsen Media Research, the town hall attracted 714,000 viewers and CNN saw a 29 percent decrease in total viewers when compared to the Tuesday night average of CNN throughout 2019.

On June 1, O'Rourke delivered remarks at the California Democratic Party Convention in San Francisco, California, referring to California and his home state of Texas as "two border states" that would share with the rest of the United States "that our security will not be purchased through walls or putting kids in cages."

On June 6, O'Rourke spoke at the Democratic National Committee's I Will Vote Gala fundraiser in Atlanta, Georgia, reiterating his support for abortion rights and announcing a proposal meant to register 50 million new voters in addition to preventing Secretary of State offices from purging voter rolls. He also supported making Election Day a national holiday.

On June 15, O'Rourke participated in a South Carolina forum, expressing his intent to push for more affordable housing options and that his administration would "complement extraordinary local leadership with federal resources and funding."

On June 27, while touring a migrant children detention facility in Homestead, Florida, O'Rourke called the detention centers the byproduct of Trump's rhetoric on immigration and said that everyone needed "to stand up and reclaim this country and what we mean to ourselves, to the rest of the world and to these kids", citing Trump as responsible for the detention facilities but everyone else as responsible for who was in the White House "going forward."

On July 7, O'Rourke held a campaign rally at Marathon Music Works in Nashville, Tennessee, where he pledged to grant citizenship to recipients of the Deferred Action for Childhood Arrivals program and to release asylum seekers from federal detention facilities.

On July 11, O'Rourke delivered remarks at the national convention of the League of United Latin American Citizens in Milwaukee, Wisconsin, saying that the United States did not "need to round up people" to keep its citizens safe and stated that he would "lead the effort of rewriting the immigration laws in our own image" if he was elected president.

On July 24, O'Rourke held a presidential forum in Detroit, Michigan and a town hall later that day in Flint, where he called climate change the "greatest existential challenge" facing both the United States and the planet.

Speaking after the 2019 El Paso shooting, during an August 5 interview with Chris Cuomo of CNN, O'Rourke called Trump the "most racist President we've had since perhaps Andrew Johnson, in another age and another century, and he is responsible for the hatred and the violence that we're seeing right now." He furthered that it was up to those trying to aid the United States to highlight the connections between violence and "what this President has said from that maiden speech when he ran for the highest office of the land."

On August 7, O'Rourke held a rally where he called the United States "a country that is not safe, that refuses to pass laws to end gun violence" and accused President Trump of demonizing communities such as the one in El Paso and vilifying immigrants.

=== Primary debates ===
The first debate of the primary season was split into two parts, with 10 candidates debating on June 26 and 10 other candidates debating on June 27; a random drawing placed O'Rourke in the former group of candidates. When asked about his view on marginal taxes, O'Rourke gave an answer in English and Spanish "that rambled through campaign finance reform, gerrymandering, same-day voter registration and “power to the people."" Later, Julian Castro asked O'Rourke why he would not support decriminalizing improper border crossings through a repeal of Section 1325 of the Immigration and Nationality Act. O'Rourke's performance was seen as helping other candidates gain exposure through their critiques of his known positions on policy, while also failing to help him break out amid dropping poll numbers.

The second debates of the primary took place on July 30 and July 31 in Detroit, with O'Rourke participating on the first night. O'Rourke stated that he was running for president because of his belief that America "discovers its greatness at its moments of greatest need" and later referred to Texas as "a new battleground state" that Democrats could put in play by going to each of its 254 counties. While there was consensus that O'Rourke's performance had improved since the first debate, he was also seen as not contributing enough in the back and forth between the progressive and centrist candidates to have a breakout performance. German Lopez observed, "He had no breakout moments. He was never at the center of the conversation, as Sanders, Warren, and even Delaney were. At times, it was easy to forget that O’Rourke was even onstage."

=== Fundraising ===
O'Rourke raised $6.1 million in the first day of his campaign, beating out Bernie Sanders' $5.9 million total and Kamala Harris's $1.5 million total for the highest first-day donation haul. This was later topped by Joe Biden, with $6.3 million. On July 15, the O'Rourke campaign announced it had raised $3.6 million over the period of the past three months, bringing his total since declaring his candidacy to over $13 million. The campaign received 119,888 contributions with $30 being the average donation size.

=== Polls ===
A Harvard University's Institute of Politics poll of likely Democratic presidential primary voters between the ages of 18 and 29 conducted between March 8 and 20, 2019 found O'Rourke in third place with 10%, behind Bernie Sanders and Joe Biden by double digits. They were the only three candidates to receive more than 5 percent support. In April, after South Bend Mayor Pete Buttigieg experienced a surge in polls, O'Rourke stated, "I just am not concerned about, nor am I following, the polls. You may know that throughout the Senate campaign we never hired a pollster or participated in a focus group." A CNN–SSRS poll conducted between April 25 and 28 showed O'Rourke with a 10-point lead over President Trump in a general election match-up with 52% of registered voters backing O'Rourke compared with Trump's 42% while 2% of voters responded that they would not support either candidate. O'Rourke held the widest lead over Trump out of the Democratic presidential candidates included in the possible match-up. A poll conducted between July 24 and 27 in his home state of Texas found O'Rourke leading all other candidates by 3 points at 27%, a 12-point increase from the previous month's University of Texas poll. With the exception of Joe Biden, who was in second with 24%, no other candidate came within a margin in the single digits of O'Rourke. An Emerson poll of Democratic primary voters conducted between July 27 and July 29 found O'Rourke in sixth place with 4%, within a margin of error of Buttigieg who was two points ahead at 6%, and a Morning Consult poll conducted between July 22 and July 28 found O'Rourke tied for sixth place with Cory Booker at 3% and also within a margin of error of Buttigieg. In an Emerson College poll conducted between August 1 and 3 of Texas presidential primary voters, O'Rourke was in second place with 19%, trailing Biden by nine points.

=== Staff and leadership ===
On May 9, the O'Rourke campaign announced the hiring of Jeff Berman, who had served as a delegate selection director for former President Barack Obama, and a delegate strategist for Hillary Clinton in the 2016 presidential election, as senior adviser for delegate strategy.

On July 17, the O'Rourke campaign announced Aisha McClendon had stepped down as Chief of Staff to Texas House Representative Toni Rose to become the campaign's national director of African American outreach.

On September 10, the O'Rourke campaign named Delilah Agho-Otoghile, former Stacey Abrams 2018 Gubernatorial Campaign field director, to head up his Texas leadership team. Along with Agho-Otoghile, Andy Brown was named the candidate's senior adviser, Chris Chu de León was named senior Texas political adviser, while Laura Hernandez and Sima Ladjevardian were named finance director and senior adviser for finance.

=== End of campaign ===
On November 1, 2019, O'Rourke announced he was ending his campaign for president. His decision to drop out of the race was ascribed to his worsening fundraising and poor performance in polls.

== Political positions ==
=== Economics ===
O'Rourke supports increasing the federal minimum wage to $15 an hour.

=== Education ===
O'Rourke supports the implementation of a universal pre-kindergarten program.

=== Immigration ===
O'Rourke opposes former President Trump's proposed Mexico–United States border wall, as well as some of the existing barriers along the U.S.–Mexico border.

=== Healthcare ===
O'Rourke does not support mandatory single-payer healthcare. Instead, he has expressed support for a public option that would allow people to enter into a Medicare-like program if they choose to; however, they could also choose to keep their private health insurance.

=== Crime ===
O'Rourke opposes the death penalty. He supports the federal legalization of recreational marijuana, saying that the prohibition of it has disproportionately affected racial minorities.

=== Social issues ===
O'Rourke supports same-sex marriage. He opposes President Trump's ban on transgender individuals in the military.

=== Guns ===
O'Rourke supports universal background checks for individuals looking to purchase firearms and a ban on assault weapons for personal sale or use. He also supports a mandatory buyback of assault weapons.

After the 2019 El Paso shooting, he called for a complete ban on the sale and possession of assault rifles and high capacity magazines and a buyback program to remove existing weapons and magazines.

On September 2, 2019, O’Rourke tweeted: "I was asked how I'd address people's fears that we will take away their assault rifles. I want to be clear: That's exactly what we're going to do. Americans who own AR-15s and AK-47s will have to sell their assault weapons [to the government]. All of them." In a September 12, 2019 Democratic presidential debate, O'Rourke again spoke out against assault weapons; he said: "'Hell yes, we're going to take your AR-15, your AK-47'". This statement generated criticism from conservatives and advocates of the Second Amendment, and some strategists suggested that his statement may have cost him politically.

=== Religious liberty ===
In October 2019, O'Rourke proposed removing the tax-exempt status of religious organizations that oppose same-sex marriage. At CNN's Equality Town Hall, O'Rourke asserted that "'there can be no reward, no benefit, no tax break for anyone or any institution, any organization in America that denies the full human rights and the full civil rights of every single one of us'". O'Rourke's press secretary later clarified that he "'was referring to religious institutions who take discriminatory action'". O'Rourke's comment was described as "infuriat[ing] a swath of religious and conservative leaders".

== See also ==
- Political positions of the 2020 Democratic Party presidential primary candidates
- 2020 Democratic Party presidential primaries
