= Ken Nwadike Jr. =

American documentary filmmaker, speaker, and activist

- Born: December 29, 1981 (age 44); San Diego, California, United States
- Other name: Free Hugs Guy
- Occupations: Inspirational speaker; Filmmaker; Activist

YouTube information
- Channel: FreeHugsProject
- Years active: 2014–present
- Genres: Motivation; Random acts of kindness; Social justice
- Subscribers: 222,000 subscribers
- Views: 56 million views
- Last updated: 20 December 2025
- Website: freehugsproject.com

Kenneth E. Nwadike Jr. is an American documentary filmmaker, motivational speaker, and peace activist popularly known as the "Free Hugs Guy". Ken is the founder of the Free Hugs Project. His "Free Hugs" videos have reached hundreds of millions of views on Facebook and YouTube.

== Career ==
In 2014, Nwadike launched the Free Hugs Project with the stated purpose of spreading love in response to the bombing of the Boston Marathon. The Free Hugs Project gained popularity in 2016, as Nwadike made major news headlines for his efforts towards de-escalation of violence during protests, riots, and political rallies. Nwadike was featured in Google's 2016 Year in Search video as a highlight among some of the year's most defining moments. Nwadike has made many appearances on news programs and radio broadcasts worldwide, including CNN, USA Today, Good Morning Britain, and BBC News.

Nwadike is the president and CEO of Superhero Events, LLC, which produces the annual Hollywood Half Marathon. The marathon, held each spring in Hollywood, California, with the purpose of raising funds for local homeless youth shelters.

On March 30, 2016, Nwadike released the controversial "Donald Trump Rally Free Hugs vs Bernie Sanders Rally Free Hugs" video to his "Free Hugs Project" channels on YouTube, Facebook and Twitter. The video became a viral hit and his #MakeAmericaLoveAgain hashtag became a trending topic on Facebook and Twitter. Nwadike's "Free Hugs" videos have reached hundreds of millions views on Facebook and YouTube.

During Super Bowl LIV, Ken Nwadike was featured in the Budweiser Super Bowl 2020 commercial titled, "Typical American" which showcases “the extraordinary people that represent the best of America.”

=== Occupations ===
As a motivational speaker, Ken details his former homelessness and states that he overcame insecurities by getting involved in extracurricular activities in school. The support, he says, he received from coaches, teammates, and friends while playing sports and participating in student government activities, helped pave the way for Ken to start a number of businesses and a charitable organization that helps homeless teens.

The Free Hugs Project is a program conducted at workplaces and colleges, designed to bridge racial divides and encourage civility.

In October 2017, Nwadike filed with the Federal Election Commission to run for President of the United States in the 2020 election. He later withdrew from the race.

== Live appearances ==
Aside from YouTube and Facebook videos, Nwadike has appeared on worldwide news programs and radio broadcasts.

- April 4, 2012 – Nwadike was featured on an NBC 4 Los Angeles special, titled, Life Connected.
- April 5, 2016 – Nwadike interview with Pix 11 news to share why he launched the Free Hugs Project.
- March 23, 2016 – Free Hugs Guy interviewed live on set during the Fox 5 San Diego morning show to discuss the Free Hugs Project and give hugs to news anchors.
- September 16, 2016 – Ken teams up with the hosts of Good Morning Britain in London to launch Free Hugs Friday.
- September 23, 2016 – Nwadike was interviewed live on CNN with Poppy Harlow after Charlotte Protests.
- January 24, 2020 - Ken Nwadike visited Fox 5 San Diego to discuss inclusion in the Budweiser Super Bowl 2020 commercial.

== Awards and nominations ==
Year	Nominated	Award	Result
2017	Ken E. Nwadike, Jr.	Most-Admired Public Leader in San Diego	Won
2017	Ken E. Nwadike, Jr.	Simeon Booker Award for Courage	Won
2017	Ken E. Nwadike, Jr.	Citizen Achievement Award	Won

== Filmography ==
Film
Year	Title	Role	Notes
2016	Accidental Courtesy: Daryl Davis, Race & America	Himself	Netflix Documentary
2017	The L.A. Riots: 25 Years Later	Himself	History Channel Documentary
2020	Called to the Front Lines	Himself	Documentary

== See also ==
- Free Hugs Campaign
