= Hollywood Half Marathon =

Hollywood Half Marathon is an annual road running event over the half marathon distance 21.0975 kilometres (13.1094 mi), which is held each spring in Hollywood, California. The race was inaugurated in 2012 and has been held every year since then to raise funds and awareness for Los Angeles youth homeless shelters. The course starts on Hollywood Boulevard and runs through Silverlake, Los Angeles neighborhoods, then returns to finish along the Hollywood Walk of Fame on Vine Street. Both men and women are able to enter the half marathon and shorter 10-kilometer race and 5 kilometer fun run.

The Hollywood Half Marathon & 5K / 10K is professionally managed by Superhero Events, LLC. Superhero Events is a Southern California-based sports marketing and management company founded by Ken E. Nwadike Jr The company was formed in 2010, in San Diego, California.
