= Richard Pzena =

American investment manager

Rich Pzena
- Born: January 8, 1959 (age 67); New York, New York, U.S.
- Education: University of Pennsylvania (B.S., MBA)
- Occupation: Investment manager
- Known for: Pzena Investment Management
- Spouse: Robin Pzena (m. 2010)
- Parent(s): Murray, Miriam

Richard "Rich" Pzena (born January 8, 1959) is an American investment manager. He is the founder and chief investment officer of Pzena Investment Management, a New York-based deep value investment firm with $80 billion in assets under management.

Barron's has noted that Pzena "isn't afraid of taking risks," and that "since its founding in 1996, his Pzena Investment Management has pursued a deep-value, concentrated portfolio strategy that has sometimes led to volatile returns."

== Personal life ==
Rich grew up in Livingston NJ, graduating from Livingston High School in 1976. He received a BS and an MBA from the Wharton School of Business in 1980. Previously he worked as an oil industry analyst for Amoco production company in Chicago and New Orleans. Prior to forming Pzena Investment Management he worked for Sanford C. Bernstein in New York, rising to the level of Chief Research Officer. Pzena married Robin Buchalter on September 11, 2010 at the Wolffer Estates in Sagaponack, New York. Pzena has 4 children from a first marriage, and 2 step-children.
