= Reality Changers =

American education organization

- Founded: 2001
- Founder: Christopher Yanov
- Location: San Diego, California
- Region served: San Diego County, California
- Website: http://realitychangers.org

Reality Changers is a non-profit organization based in San Diego, California. Founded by Christopher Yanov in May 2001, Reality Changers provides tutoring and mentoring services to high school students, and primarily serves aspiring first-generation college students in San Diego County.

== History ==
Reality Changers was founded in May 2001 by Chris Yanov, with initial funds of $300 and a class of four eighth-grade students. Additional start-up support came from a portion of approximately $23,000 that Yanov won as a contestant on the television game show Wheel of Fortune. Yanov was motivated to create the program to give students an opportunity to become the first in their families to attend college and provide a positive peer culture, as opposed to the street gang culture which presented a danger to much of the population targeted by Reality Changers.

Reality Changers was originally located at a Presbyterian church in Golden Hill, near downtown San Diego. Its headquarters were later moved to the City Heights neighborhood, with an additional location in Solana Beach.

By 2008, the organization had grown to serve 100 students a year, with 50 alumni of the program who had graduated from four-year colleges throughout the United States. As of late 2013, the program had served a total of 485 students. In addition, through early 2013, the organization has distributed over $1 million in scholarships to students attending the University of California, San Diego, primarily for summer immersion programs.

In 2011, Reality Changers opened College Apps Academy, a tuition-based service open to all San Diego County high school students focused on the college admissions process. The organization uses the proceeds of this service to support its other programs. By late 2013, College Apps Academy had 19 locations, each with capacity for 20 students. It maintains relationships with entities such as UC San Diego and the Princeton Review.

== Description ==
In order to join the program, students must agree to abide by certain rules, such as maintaining a 3.0 grade point average, joining a school club or sports team, weekly program attendance, and minimum volunteer hours with Reality Changers. In exchange, students receive intensive tutoring and mentoring, including assistance with preparation for standardized tests such as the SAT, and guidance throughout the college application process, including preparing college lists, refining application essays, and assistance with application fees.

Students who complete the Reality Changers program have a high likelihood of attending and graduating from a four-year college. As of 2011, 172 of 179 graduates had matriculated into college, with 10 of those students dropping out before completing their degrees. As of 2012, Reality Changers graduates had earned an estimated $25 million in scholarships for college. This number had grown to $40 million by late 2013 and $60 million by 2015. Several students have been named Gates Millennium Scholars, including five winners in 2014, five winners in 2012, three in 2011, two in 2010 and one in 2005.

Reality Changers has received visits from former head of the U.S. Department of Education Arne Duncan, and former president of Mexico Vicente Fox. Fox has stated that he wishes to copy the blueprint established by Reality Changers in Mexico, working with the group's leadership. Reality Changers and one of its graduates, Eduardo Corona, were featured in a 2013 documentary on PBS, The Graduates/Los Graduados.

== Bibliography ==
- Davenport, Barbara. Grit and Hope: A Year with Five Latino Students and the Program that Helped Them Aim for College. University of California Press. 2016.
