= Feltman =

Feltman is a surname. Notable people with the surname include:

- Art Feltman (born 1958), American politician from Connecticut
- Charles Feltman (1841–1910), German-American baker who invented the hot dog
- Bud Feltman (born 1939), former member of the first United States Olympic luge team
- Erika Feltman or Erika Felten, (born 1943), West German sprint canoeist
- Jeffrey D. Feltman (born 1959), American diplomat, Assistant Secretary of State for Near Eastern Affairs
- Samuel Feltman (1899–1951), Chief of the Ballistic Section of the U.S. Army Ordnance Research and Development Division

== See also ==
- Feldman
- Feldmann
- Feltsman
- Fieldsman
- Flatman
- Veltman
