= Feltsman =

Feltsman is a surname. Notable people with the surname include:

- Oscar Feltsman (1921–2013), Ukrainian-born Soviet/Russian composer
- Vladimir Feltsman (born 1952), Russian-American classical pianist

== See also ==
- Felsmann (Felsman, Felszmann, Felszman)
- Felzmann (Felcman)
- Feldman
- Feldmann
- Feltman
