= Feldman =

Feldman is a German and Ashkenazi Jewish surname. Notable people with the surname include:

== Academics ==
- Arthur Feldman (born 1949), American cardiologist
- Chanda Feldman (born 1976), American poet
- David B. Feldman, American psychologist
- David Feldman (historian), American historian
- David Feldman (lawyer), British lawyer
- Gary Feldman, American particle physicist
- Gerald Feldman, American Historian
- Grigory Feldman (1884–1958), Soviet mathematician and economist
- Heidi Li Feldman, American law professor
- Hume Feldman, American Cosmologist
- Joel Feldman (born Ottawa), Canadian physicist and mathematician
- Józef Feldman (1899–1946), Polish historian
- Lewis J. Feldman (born 1945), American botanist
- Lisa Feldman Barrett (born 1963), American psychologist
- Louis Feldman (1926–2017), American scholar of literature
- Marcus Feldman (born 1942), Australian geneticist
- Michal Feldman, Israeli computer scientist
- Noah Feldman (born 1970), American lawyer
- Rubén Feldman (born 1940), Argentine physician
- Shirley Feldman (born 1944), American psychologist
- William Hugh Feldman (1892–1974), Scottish-American veterinarian and professor of pathology

== Film, television, radio, and theater ==
- Andrea Feldman (1948–1972), American actress
- Andrew Barth Feldman (born 2002), American actor
- Ben Feldman (born 1980), American actor
- Charles K. Feldman (1905–1968), American film agent and producer
- Corey Feldman (born 1971), American actor
- David Feldman (comedian), American comedy writer and performer
- Donna Feldman (born 1982), American model and actress
- Edward H. Feldman (1920–1988), American director and producer
- Edward S. Feldman (1929–2020), American film and television producer
- Fivel Feldman, birth name of Phil Foster, American actor
- Juan Feldman (born 1972), Uruguayan-American film producer and director
- Krystyna Feldman (1916–2007), Polish actress
- Liz Feldman (born 1977), American comedian, actress, producer and writer
- LM Feldman, American playwright
- Marty Feldman (1934–1982), British actor and comedian
- Michael Feldman (radio personality) (born 1949), American radio personality
- Tamara Feldman (born 1980), American actress

== Musicians ==
- Bert Feldman (1874–1945), British music publisher
- Bob Feldman (1940–2023), American songwriter and record producer
- David Feldman (musician) (born 1977), Brazilian-Israeli jazz and bossa nova musician
- Eric Drew Feldman (born 1955), American keyboard and bass guitar player
- Kurt Feldman (born 1984), American musician, composer, producer and multi-instrumentalist
- Lee Feldman (born 1959), American singer-songwriter and musician
- Mark Feldman (born 1955), American jazz violinist
- Maxine Feldman (1945–2007), American folk singer-songwriter and comedian
- Morton Feldman (1926–1987), American composer
- Nick Feldman (born 1955), British musician
- Victor Feldman (1934–1987), British jazz musician
- Oscar Feldman (born 1961), Argentine jazz saxophonist

== Politicians and diplomats ==
- Andrew Feldman, Baron Feldman of Elstree (born 1966), British barrister, businessman and politician
- Basil Feldman, Baron Feldman (1923–2019), British politician
- Harvey Feldman (1931–2009), American diplomat
- Mike Feldman (1927–2023), Canadian politician

== Religious figures ==
- Abraham J. Feldman (1893–1977), Ukrainian-American rabbi
- Aharon Feldman (born 1932), American rabbi
- Emanuel Feldman (born 1927), American rabbi
- Ilan D. Feldman, American rabbi
- Pinchus Feldman (born 1945), Australian rabbi

== Sportspeople ==
- Dave Feldman (born 1965), American sportscaster
- Harry Feldman (1919–1962), American baseball player
- Luke Feldman (born 1984), Australian cricketer
- Scott Feldman (born 1983), American baseball player

== Others ==
- Amy Feldman (born 1981), American abstract painter
- Allison Feldman, American murder victim
- Damon Feldman (born 1985), American boxer and businessman
- David Feldman (author) (born 1950), American writer
- David Feldman (philatelist) (born 1947), Irish philatelist
- Deborah Feldman (born 1986), American writer
- Heinrich Feldman (1935–2022), British property investor
- Leah Feldman (1899–1993), anarchist
- Lee Feldman (businessman) (born 1967/68), American lawyer and businessman
- Martin Leach-Cross Feldman (1934–2022), American judge
- Micaela Feldman (1902–1992), Argentine militant anarchist
- Michael Feldman (consultant) (born 1968), American public relations consultant
- Miroslav Feldman (1899–1976), Croatian poet and writer
- Sam Feldman (born 1949), Canadian music executive

== See also ==
- David Feldman (disambiguation)
- Feldmann
- Klee
