= David Feldman =

David Feldman may refer to:

- David Feldman (author) (born 1950), American writer
- David Feldman (comedian), American comedy writer and performer
- David Feldman (historian) (born 1957), British historian
- David Feldman (lawyer) (born 1953), British lawyer
- David Feldman (musician) (born 1977), Brazilian-Israeli jazz and bossa nova musician
- David Feldman (philatelist) (born 1947), Irish philatelist and chairman of Swiss philatelic auction company
- David B. Feldman, American psychologist
- David Matthew Feldman (born 1973), puppeteer and voice of Mayor Milford Meanswell in the Icelandic children's TV series LazyTown
- Dave Feldman (born 1965), American sportscaster
- David Feldman (born 1970), former boxer and Bare Knuckle FC president
