= Eitner =

Eitner is a surname. Notable people with the surname include:

- Don Eitner (1934–2018), American film and television actor
- Felix Eitner (1967–2025), German actor
- Lorenz Eitner (1919–2009), German art historian and museum director
- Robert Eitner (1832–2005), German musicologist, researcher and bibliographer
