= Michael Feldman =

Michael Feldman may refer to:

- Michael Brandon (born 1945), American actor born Michael Feldman
- Michael Feldman (radio personality) (born 1949), American radio personality
- Michael Feldman (consultant) (born 1968), American public relations consultant
- Michael Feldman (writer), American television producer
- Mike Feldman (1928–2023), Toronto politician

== See also ==
- Feldman
