= Ferdman =

Ferdman is a surname. Notable people with the surname include:

- Jeremy Ferdman (born 1986), Canadian actor
- Tatiana Ferdman (born 1957), Russian table tennis player

== See also ==
- Feldman
