= Lukas Felzmann =

American landscape photographer

- Born: 25 January 1959 (age 67); Zürich, Switzerland
- Known for: Photography

Lukas Felzmann (born 25 January 1959) is a Swiss photographer and teacher. His work examines the intersection of nature and culture through sculpture, conceptual books, and photography.

Felzmann has taught in the Department of Art and Art History at Stanford University for 25 years. He has also taught at the California College of the Arts, Mills College, San Francisco Arts Education Project, and the San Francisco Art Institute. He is currently an Affiliate Scholar at the Bill Lane Center for the American West at Stanford.

== Background and education ==
Felzmann was born in 1959 in Zürich, Switzerland. He moved to America in 1981 to earn a Master's of Fine Arts from the San Francisco Art Institute.

== Works ==
=== Landfall ===
Landfall (2004) is a monograph that contains: photographs taken between the Great Basin Deserts, Sierra Nevada, and the Pacific Ocean on the west coast of the US of abandoned buildings and roads, flotsam and jetsam; and an essay by Peter Pfrunder. Part travel diary, meditation, and guidebook this collection of photographs is described by Peter Pfrunder as, "an inner journey that leads, as in a dream, into the observer's deeper, subconscious zones rather than to a real place." It reads like a visual novella.

=== Waters in Between ===
Waters in Between (2009) is a monograph examining the relationship between how humans relate and attempt to control nature through photographs of the Sacramento Valley and short texts by John Berger and Angelus Silesius. The book emphasizes how the role of water—its historical flooding cycles compared with modern canals and underground systems—has transformed the marshland of the valley. The intention is to create what Felzmann calls, "a sort of poetry of ruins."

=== Swarm ===
Swarm (2011) is a monograph with photographs of migrating birds and essays by Peter Pfrunder, Gordon H. Orians, Deborah M. Gordon, and Wallace Stevens. It investigates and celebrates flight, considering how a system without a hierarchy nor centralized control works. Sequenced photographs of birds close-up, in functioning groups, and in relation to their surrounding landscape reveal how this complex system operates.

=== Gull JuJu ===
Gull JuJu (2015) is a monograph about the Farallon Islands. Felzmann continues his photographic investigation of migratory birds while also documenting human objects regurgitated by western gulls on the island alongside photos of the island's geology. While observing the interactions between the handful of scientists who work on the island and the island's animals and geology, Felzmann discovered an old box that said, "Gull Juju Archive. Strong Juju." This box contains those regurgitated objects, whereby he photographed and included every item from the box in this monograph as he felt, "the gulls had already done the editing." These items evoke the Great Pacific Garbage Patch, which highlight the degradation of the marine environment through these human objects.

=== Apophenia ===
Apophenia (2018) is a monograph that includes two archives of images. One is postcards sent to his father. The other is his own photographs. Apophenia is the tendency to perceive patterns in random information, which is prompted by the weaving of these two archives.

== Selected grants, awards, and commissions ==
Felzmann was a Headland's artist in resident in 1991. He is also the recipient of two grants of the Federal Department of the Interior, Switzerland, two National Endowment for the Arts Grants, US, an International Photobook Award from Kassel Germany, 2009, and the Best International Photobook of the Year Award from PHotoEspaña, Spain, 2012. In 2018, Felzmann was awarded a Guggenheim Foundation Fellowship in photography.

== Publications ==
- Landfall (with text by Peter Pfrunder), Fotostiftung Schweiz and Lars Müller Publishers, Zürich, 2004
- Helix (with text by Edgar Allan Poe), Cavallo Point, Sausalito, 2008
- Waters in Between (with texts by John Berger and Angelus Silesius), Lars Müller Publishers, Zürich, 2009
- Swarm (with texts by Peter Pfrunder, G.Orians, D.Gordon, Wallace Stevens), Lars Müller Publishers, Zürich, 2011
- Gull Juju, Lars Müller Publishers, Zürich, 2015
- Apophenia (with text by Peter Pfrunder), Koenig Books London and Codax Publishers, Zürich, 2018

=== Selected anthologies ===
- Photographie in der Schweiz von 1840 bis heute, Benteli, Bern, 1992
- Made in Switzerland. Aus der Fotosammlung der Eidgenossenschaft, Federal Office for Culture, Bern, 1997
- Images du monde, Musée Historique, Lausanne, 2004
- Kindheit in der Schweiz Limmat, Zürich, 2015

== Exhibitions ==
- Room for Endangered Species, the Headlands Center for the Arts, 1991
- Picturing Modernity, San Francisco Museum of Modern Art, 1998
- Not Landscape: Fragments and Metaphors, San Francisco Camerawork, 2001
- Gull Juju–The Farallon Islands, Fotostiftung Schweiz, 2003
- Landfall, Fotostiftung Schweiz, 2004
- Landfall, Contemporary Arts Forum Alexandria, 2006
- Ghostpile, Stanford Art Gallery, 2008
- A Chance for the Unpredictable, Lianzhou Foto festival, 2019

== Collections ==
Felzmann's work is held in the following public collections:

- San Francisco Museum of Modern Art
- The Museum of Fine Arts, Houston
- Swiss Foundation for Photography, Winterthur (in German: Fotostiftung Schweiz): 484 prints (as of March 2021)
- Foundation Herzog, Basel
- Stanford Museum of Art / Cantor Art Center
- Santa Barbara Museum of Art
- San Francisco Art Institute
- DiRosa Foundation, California
