= Felzmann =

Felzmann is a surname. Notable people with the surname include:

- Lukas Felzmann (born 1959), Swiss photographer and teacher
- Maximilian Felzmann (1894–1962), Austrian general
