= Arthur Feldman =

American cardiologist

Arthur M. Feldman
- Born: Arthur Michael Feldman; 1949 (age 76–77)
- Education: Gettysburg College; Louisiana State University
- Awards: Distinguished Scientist Award-Basic Domain from the American College of Cardiology (2019)
- Scientific career
- Fields: Cardiology
- Institutions: Temple University

Arthur Michael Feldman (born 1949) is an American cardiologist and the Laura H. Carnell Professor of Medicine in the Lewis Katz School of Medicine at Temple University, known for his research on heart failure. Among his previous positions include Harry S. Tack Professor and Chief of the Division of Cardiology at the University of Pittsburgh, Magee Chair of the Department of Medicine at Jefferson Medical College, and Executive Dean of the Lewis Katz School of Medicine. He was the founding editor-in-chief of Clinical and Translational Science and the Journal of Clinical and Translational Science. In 2019, he received the Distinguished Scientist Award-Basic Domain from the American College of Cardiology.
