= Aloys Feldmann =

German politician (1897–1965)

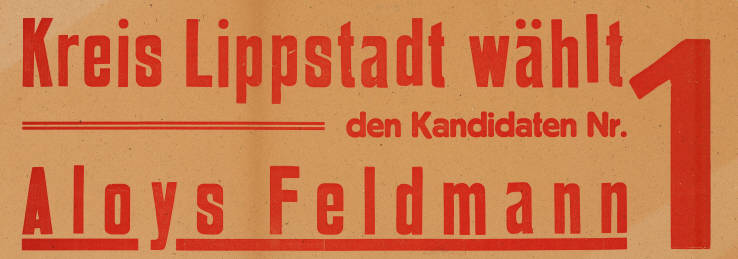
- Aloys Feldmann's candidate poster for the state election in North Rhine-Westphalia 1947

Member of the Bundestag
- In office 07. Sep 49 – 6 October 1957

Personal details
- Born: 25 April 1897
- Died: 9 October 1965 (aged 68) Mülheim an der Ruhr, North Rhine-Westphalia, Germany
- Party: CDU

Aloys Feldmann (April 25, 1897 – October 9, 1965) was a German politician of the Christian Democratic Union (CDU) and former member of the German Bundestag.

== Life ==
Feldmann was one of the co-founders of the CDU Westfalen-Lippe in 1946/47. He was a member of the state parliament of North Rhine-Westphalia from 1946 to 1950. He was a member of the German Bundestag from its first election in 1949 to 1957 as a member of parliament directly elected to the parliament of the constituency of Lippstadt-Brilon.

== Literature ==
Herbst, Ludolf; Jahn, Bruno (2002). Vierhaus, Rudolf (ed.). Biographisches Handbuch der Mitglieder des Deutschen Bundestages. 1949–2002 [Biographical Handbook of the Members of the German Bundestag. 1949–2002] (in German). München: De Gruyter - De Gruyter Saur. p. 1715. ISBN 978-3-11-184511-1.
