= Bud Feltman =

American luger (born 1939)

Francis Feltman
Personal information
- Born: March 12, 1939 (age 86) Idaho Falls, Idaho, United States

Sport
- Sport: Luge

Francis Lloyd Feltman (born March 12, 1939), nicknamed "Bud" or "Buddy", is a former member of the first United States Olympic luge team, which competed in the 1964 Winter Olympic Games in Innsbruck, Austria. Feltman held the U.S. men's luge record until 2002.

Feltman was born and raised in Idaho Falls, Idaho, and attended Idaho Falls High School. He briefly attended college at Utah State University before joining the army.

In the early 1960s, Feltman was a part of the U.S. Army ski team in Germany. During that time, he and a few other Army ski members formed a luge team, coached by Bob Cole. They were the first luge team to represent the United States in the 1964 Winter Olympic Games in Innsbruk, Austria. Feltman was on track to win the bronze medal, but had a disappointing final run and placed 13th.

In 1968, Feltman coached the Canadian luge team for the 1968 Winter Olympics in Grenoble, France.

In the 1970s, Feltman helped start Scott USA, later leaving to start Smith USA, a ski goggle and pole company. In 1984, he started a sportswear glasses company called SVSV. Feltman has worked in timeshare and real estate sales since the 1990s. He has also taught skiing at Deer Valley. He has since lived in Newport Beach, California, Kapaa, Hawaii and Park City, Utah. He currently lives in Ecuador. Feltman has three daughters, Tiffany (1969), Shelby (1972) and Miley (1991), and four grandchildren.
