= Feldmann =

Feldmann is a German surname. Notable people with the surname include:

- Aloys Feldmann (1897–1965), German politician
- Anja Feldmann (born 1966), German computer scientist
- Else Feldmann (1884-1942), Austrian writer and journalist
- Gyula Feldmann (1880-1955), Jewish Hungarian football player and coach
- Jean Feldmann (1905–1978), French algologist, given the standard abbreviation "Feldmann"
- John Feldmann (born 1967), American musician and producer, member of band Goldfinger
- Markus Feldmann (1897-1958), Swiss politician
- Olaf Feldmann (born 1937), German politician
- Rötger Feldmann (born 1950), German comic book artist also known as Brösel

== See also ==
- Killing of Susanna Feldmann, a 2018 crime which occurred in Germany
- Feldmann's method, a method of titration of tannin, especially in wine
- Feldman
