= Flatman =

Flatman is a surname. Notable people with the surname include:

- Ada Flatman (1876–1952), British suffragette
- Barry Flatman (born 1950), Canadian actor
- David Flatman (born 1980), English rugby player
- Frederick Flatman (1843–1911), New Zealand Member of Parliament
- Nat Flatman (1810–1860), 19th-century English champion jockey
- Nigel Flatman (born 1960), English motorcycle speedway rider
- Thomas Flatman (1635–1688), English poet and miniature painter

== See also ==
- Flatman (character), Marvel Comics character and member of the Great Lakes Avengers
- Flatmania, Franco-Canadian television series
