= Shirley Feldman =

American developmental psychologist

- Scientific career
- Fields: Developmental psychology
- Institutions: Stanford University

Sarah Shirley Feldman (born March 1, 1944) is an American developmental psychologist and senior research scientist in Psychiatry and the Behavioral Sciences at Stanford University, where she is also associate director in the Program in Human Biology. She was the director of Stanford's Center for the Study of Families, Children, and Youth from 1991 until the center closed in 1994. She collaborated with Paul R. Ehrlich on the 1977 book The Race Bomb: Skin Color, Prejudice, and Intelligence.

== Publications ==
- Ehrlich, Paul; Feldman, Shirley (1977). The Race Bomb: Skin Color, Prejudice, and Intelligence. Quadrangle Books.
