= Cantor Arts Center =

Iris and B. Gerald Cantor Center for Visual Arts
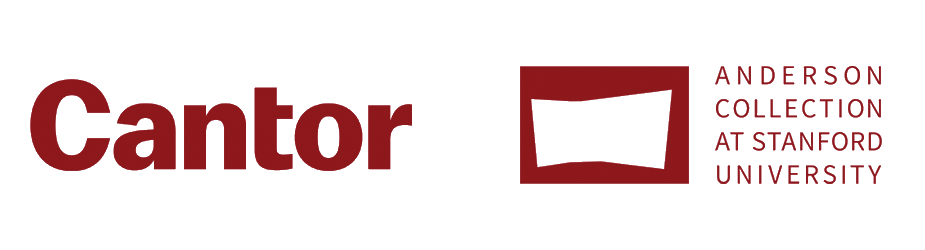

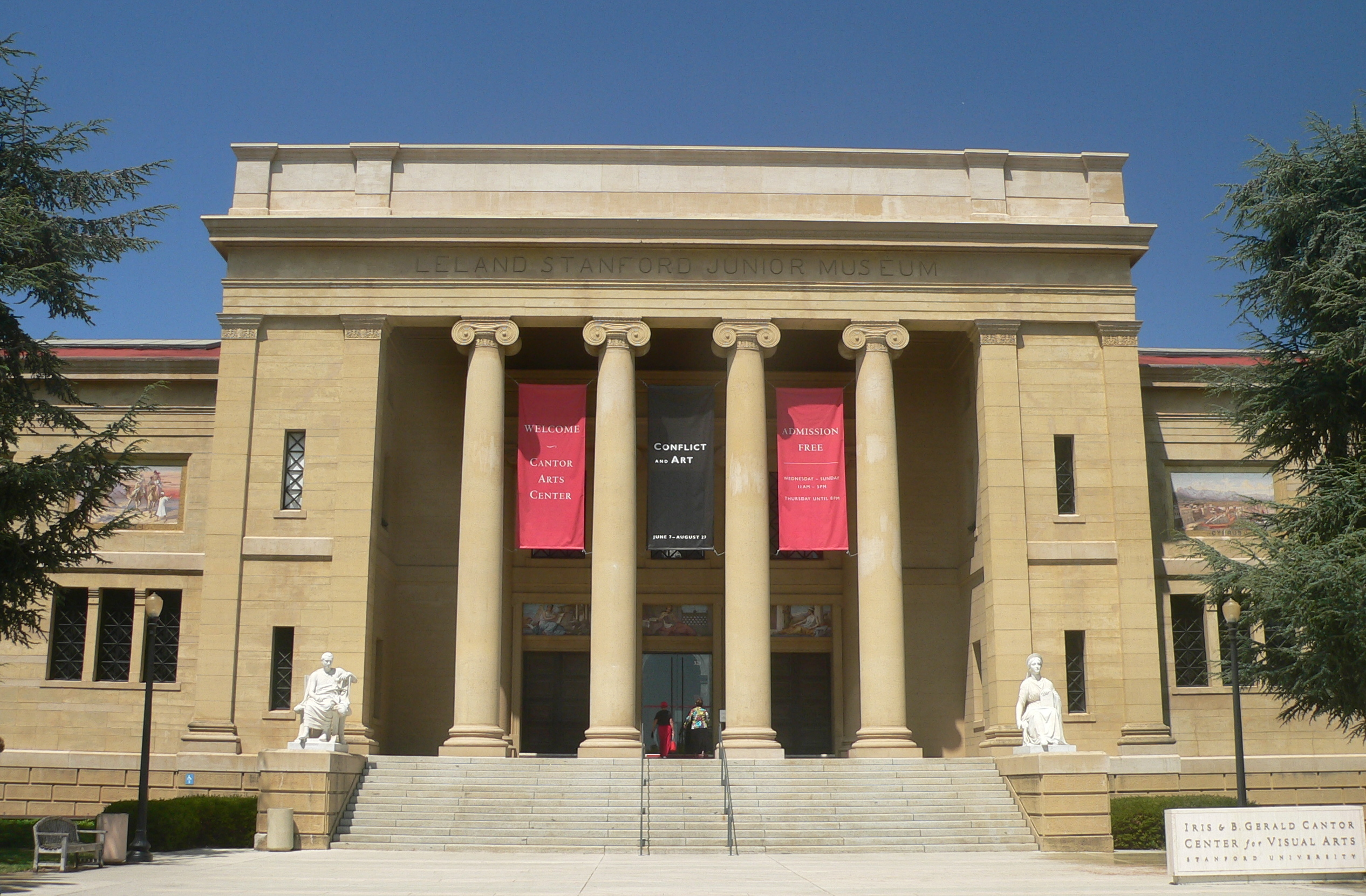
- Historic facade and main entrance.
- Interactive fullscreen map
- Former name: The Stanford University Museum of Art
- Established: 1894
- Location: Stanford, California
- Coordinates: 37°25′59″N 122°10′15″W
- Type: Art museum
- Key holdings: Rodin, Muybridge, Diebenkorn, Warhol, Stanford family collections and memorabilia
- Founder: The Stanford family
- Director: Veronica Roberts
- Website: museum.stanford.edu

Cantor Arts Center (officially Iris and B. Gerald Cantor Center for Visual Arts at Stanford University, previously the Stanford University Museum of Art) is an art museum on the campus of Stanford University in Stanford, California, United States.

The museum first opened in 1894 and consists of over 130,000 sq ft (12,000 m^{2}) of exhibition space, including sculpture gardens. The Cantor Arts Center houses the largest collection of sculptures by Auguste Rodin outside of Paris and the Soumaya Museum in Mexico City, with 199 works, most in bronze but others in different media. In 2024, the Cantor was ranked by the Washington Post as one of the five best college art museums in the U.S. The museum is open to the public and charges no admission.

== History ==
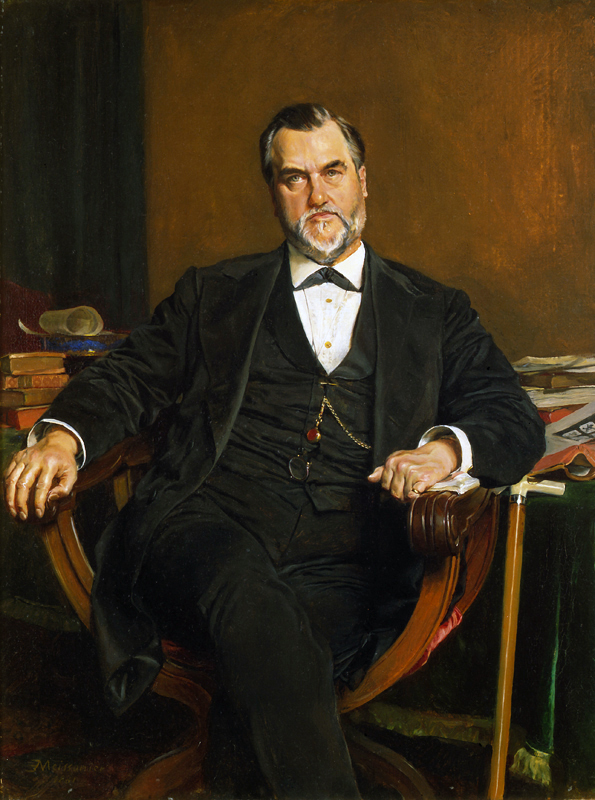
Leland Stanford (1881) by Jean-Louis-Ernest Meissonier.

When it first opened its doors to the public in 1894, the Leland Stanford Jr. Museum was unique, having been privately founded by a family with a general collection of world art on par with the major public museums at the time. For decades, Leland Stanford and his wife Jane Stanford had traveled extensively, collecting American and European Old Master paintings, as well as a wide array of antiquities from Egypt, Greece, Rome, Asia, the Americas, and other parts of the world. By the turn of the century, the Stanford museum, with its large archeological and ethnological holdings as well as art, was the largest privately owned museum in the world.

The 1906 San Francisco earthquake was an enormous disaster for the museum. The Roman, Egyptian and Asian galleries were destroyed, and three-quarters of the building was damaged beyond repair. The Oxford Assyriologist Archibald Sayce, recalling a visit to Stanford in 1917, wrote that "the rooms of its spacious Museum were still a scene of wreckage. The magnificent collection of Greek vases it once contained had been hopelessly shattered; even the Egyptian mummies were torn and dismembered."

The earthquake, along with the death of co-founder Jane Stanford the previous year, sharply curtailed the budget of the museum, which had no endowment. Faculty and administration had little interest in restoring the museum, and the building and its collection fell into disrepair. Curatorial duties ceased.

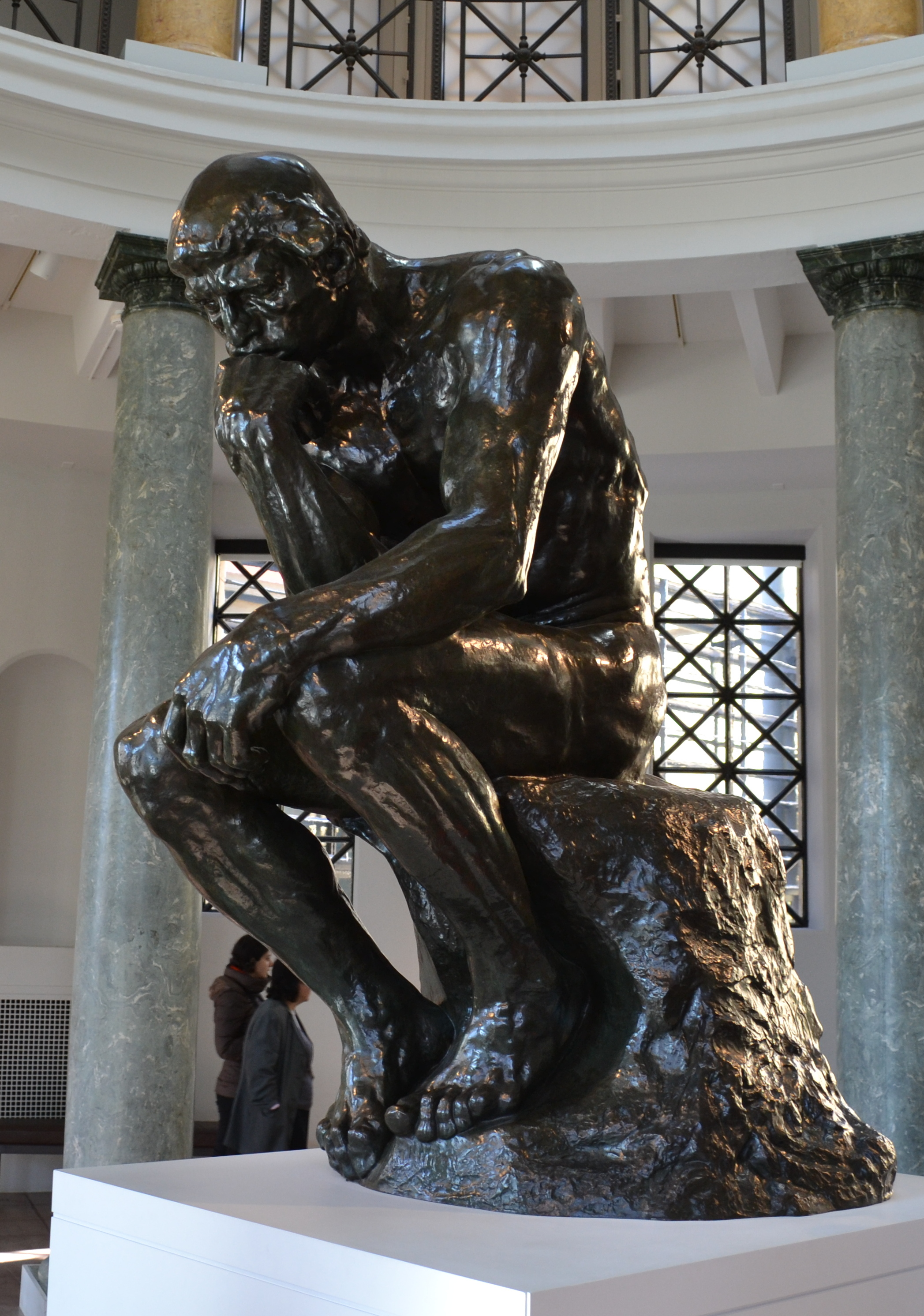
The Thinker by Rodin in the rotunda of the new wing.

In 1917 Pedro Joseph de Lemos resigned as head of the San Francisco Art Institute to teach at Stanford, where he also served as Curator and Director of the Stanford University Museum and the Thomas Welton Stanford Art Gallery until 1945. He reorganized the museum and began a regular series of exhibitions at both venues. But during this period the art collection was decimated by loss, sales, and gifts, and the poorly secured storage area became a quarry for local collectors and dealers. In 1945, after de Lemos' departure, the museum was officially closed in order to conduct an inventory of the art holdings.

The university's art department saw the inventory as an opportunity to divest the museum of works of art lacking aesthetic merit. An enormous accumulation of worthless material was disposed of, but so too were paintings and sculptures from the original Stanford family collection judged now to be of greater value than was believed in the 1950s, including works by Albert Bierstadt, William Bradford, Norton Bush, and Thomas Hill.

In 1953, the Committee for Art at Stanford was founded, with the intention of recruiting members and raising funds to reopen the museum, and in 1954, after nine years of stocktaking, the museum reopened.

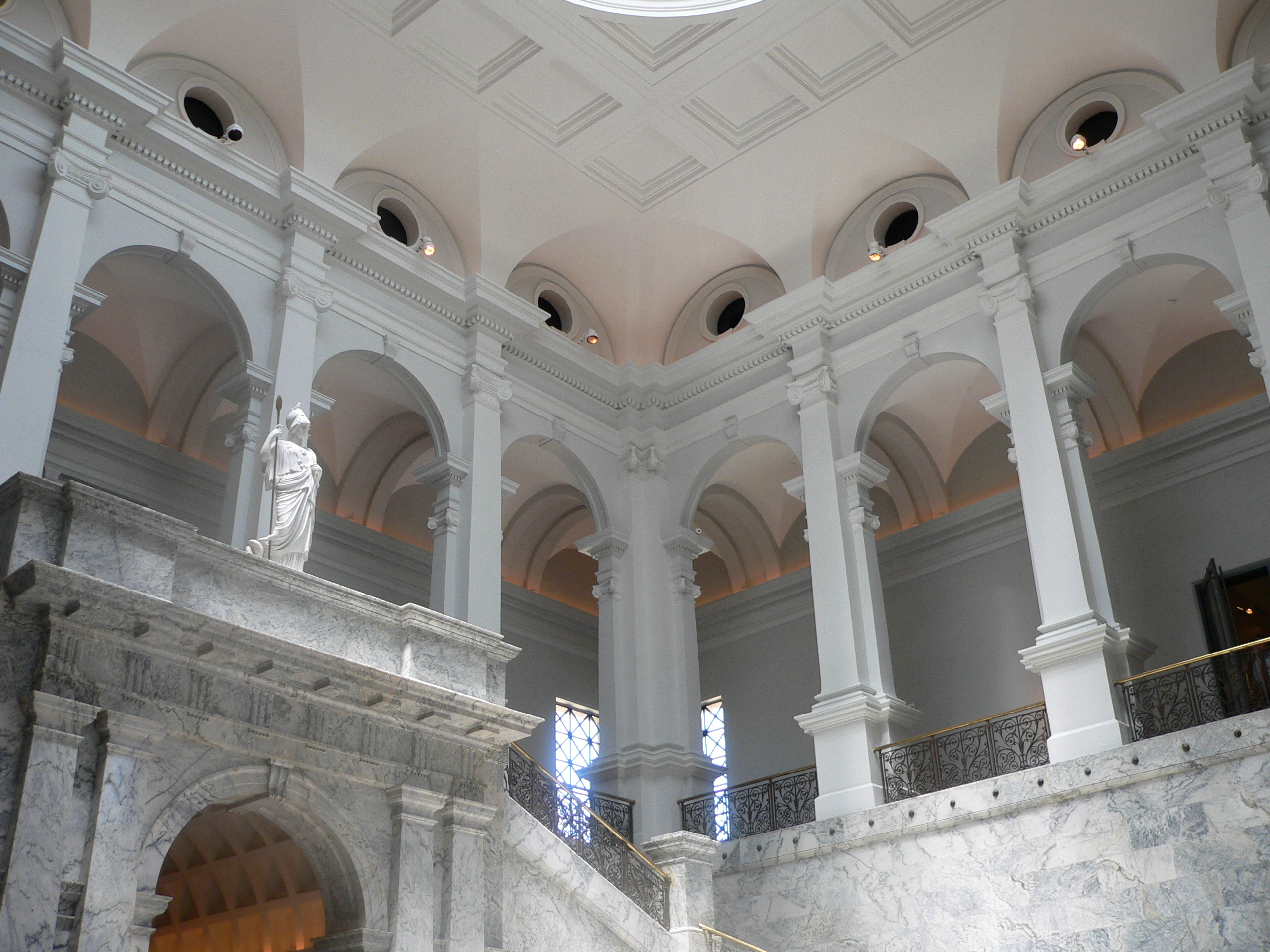
Athena, by 19th century Italian sculptor Antonio Frilli, presides over the marble vestibule.

In 1963, as part of the university's revitalization of the humanities under Dean Robert R. Sears, Professor Lorenz Eitner was instated as chair of the department of art and architecture. Assisted by faculty, staff, and The Committee for Art, Eitner began to revive the museum. Over the next 25 years, galleries were gradually refurbished, collections were significantly strengthened, and a program of exhibitions, educational services, and publications was put in place. 1985 saw a major development when professor Albert Elsen worked with art collector B. Gerald Cantor and other donors to open the B. Gerald Cantor Rodin Sculpture Garden.

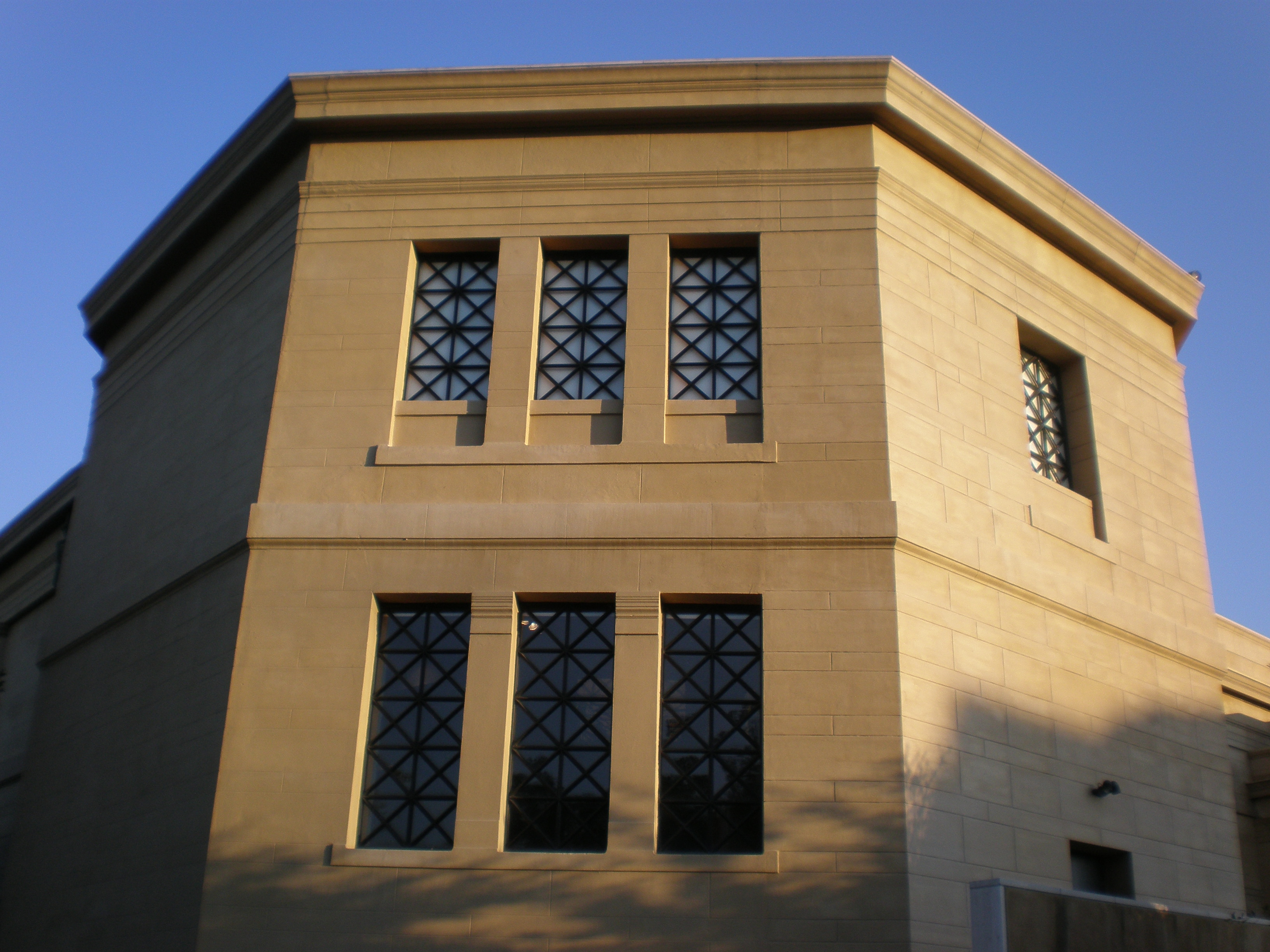
Facade of the new wing.

The museum suffered severe damage from the 1989 Loma Prieta earthquake and was forced to close. In 1991, Stanford hired Thomas K. Seligman to direct the rebuilding of the museum. Polshek & Partners of New York (now Ennead Architects) won the architectural competition, with Richard Olcott as principal designer. Groundbreaking took place on October 26, 1995, and the museum reopened in late 1999 as the Iris & B. Gerald Cantor Center for the Visual Arts, named after Iris and B. Gerald Cantor. The project cost $36.8 million, which included a seismic retrofit of the entire building, and construction of a new 42,000 square foot wing including galleries, a sculpture terrace, auditorium, bookshop and cafe. The Rodin Sculpture Garden was renovated, and new gardens were installed for displaying contemporary art.

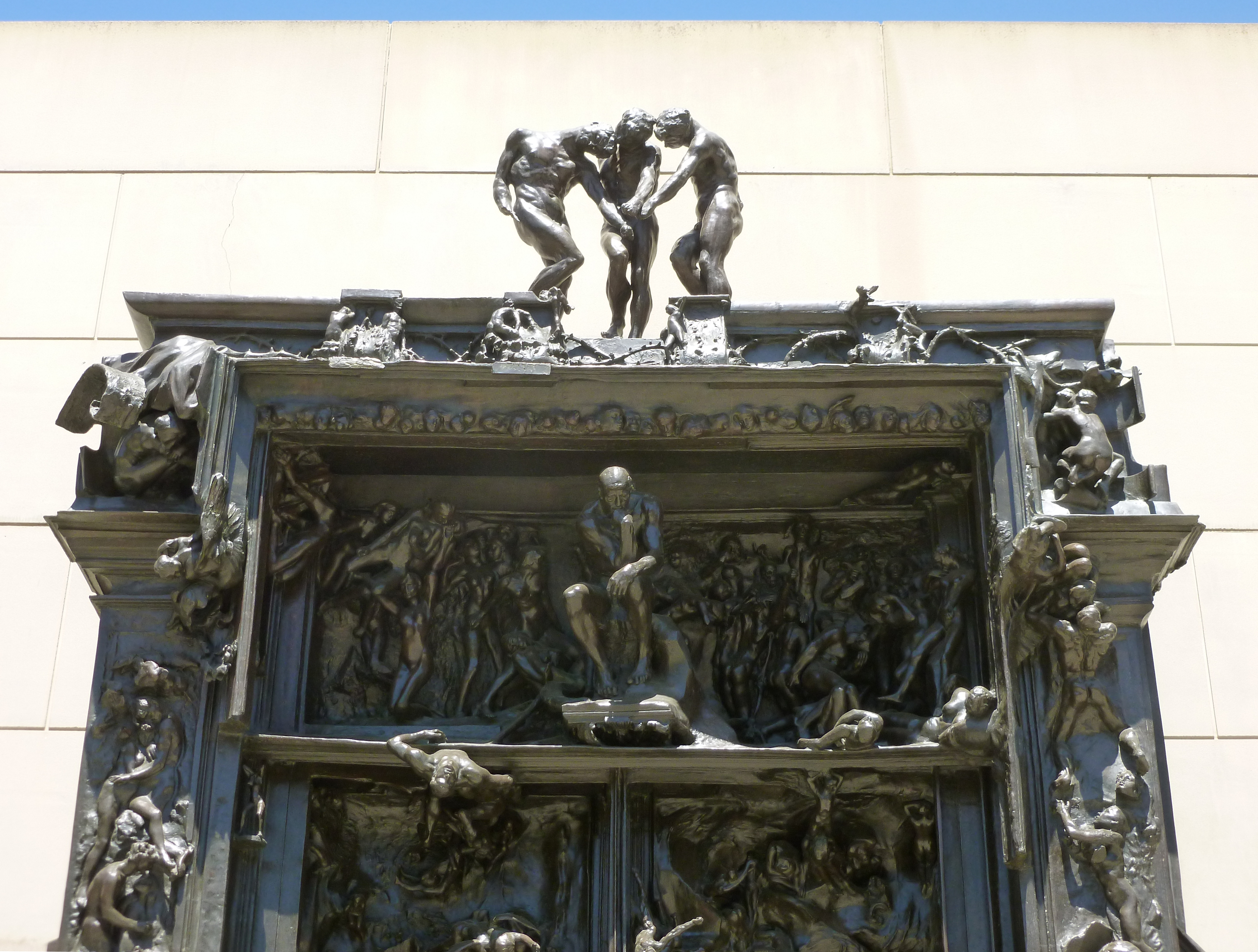
Gates of Hell (detail) in the Rodin Sculpture Garden.

In 2011, Stanford University announced the donation of 121 paintings and sculptures from Harry W. Anderson and Mary Margaret Anderson, and their daughter, Mary Patricia Anderson Pence, of Atherton, California. The collection, mostly of post-WW2 American art, includes works by Mark Rothko, Richard Diebenkorn, Manuel Neri, Frank Lobdell and Willem de Kooning, and Jackson Pollock's Lucifer ("probably the privately owned 20th century American artwork most coveted by museums nationwide"). To house and display this collection, a new museum, the Anderson Collection at Stanford University, was built directly adjacent to the Cantor Arts Center. Designed by the same architect who designed the new wing of the Cantor, Richard Olcott of Ennead Architects, the Anderson Collection opened in 2014. The building has 15,000 square feet of exhibition space. Like the Cantor, the Anderson Collection is free and open to the public.

== Collection ==
The Cantor Arts Center's collection houses over 38,000 items, including African Art, American Art, Ancient Art, the Andy Warhol Photography Archive, Art of Asia and Oceania, Art of the Indigenous Americas, Auguste Rodin, Eadweard Muybridge, European Art, Modern and Contemporary Art, Photographs, Prints and Drawings, Richard Diebenkorn Sketchbooks, Sculptures on Campus, and collections and memorabilia of the Stanford Family.

In January 2021, the Cantor Arts Center established the Asian American Art Initiative (AAAI) with specific focus on the study, acquisition, preservation, and exhibition of works by Asian American artists. The initiative is headed by the founding co-directors Aleesa Alexander and Marci Kwon.

== Gallery ==
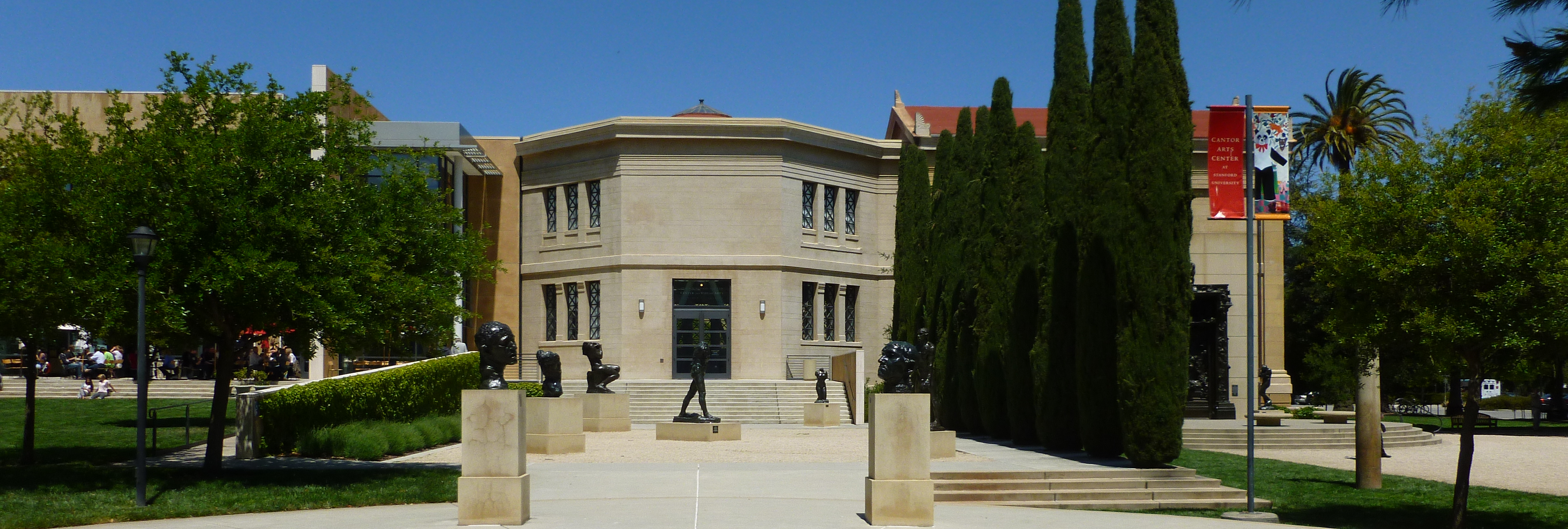
West entrance of the new wing and Rodin Sculpture Garden
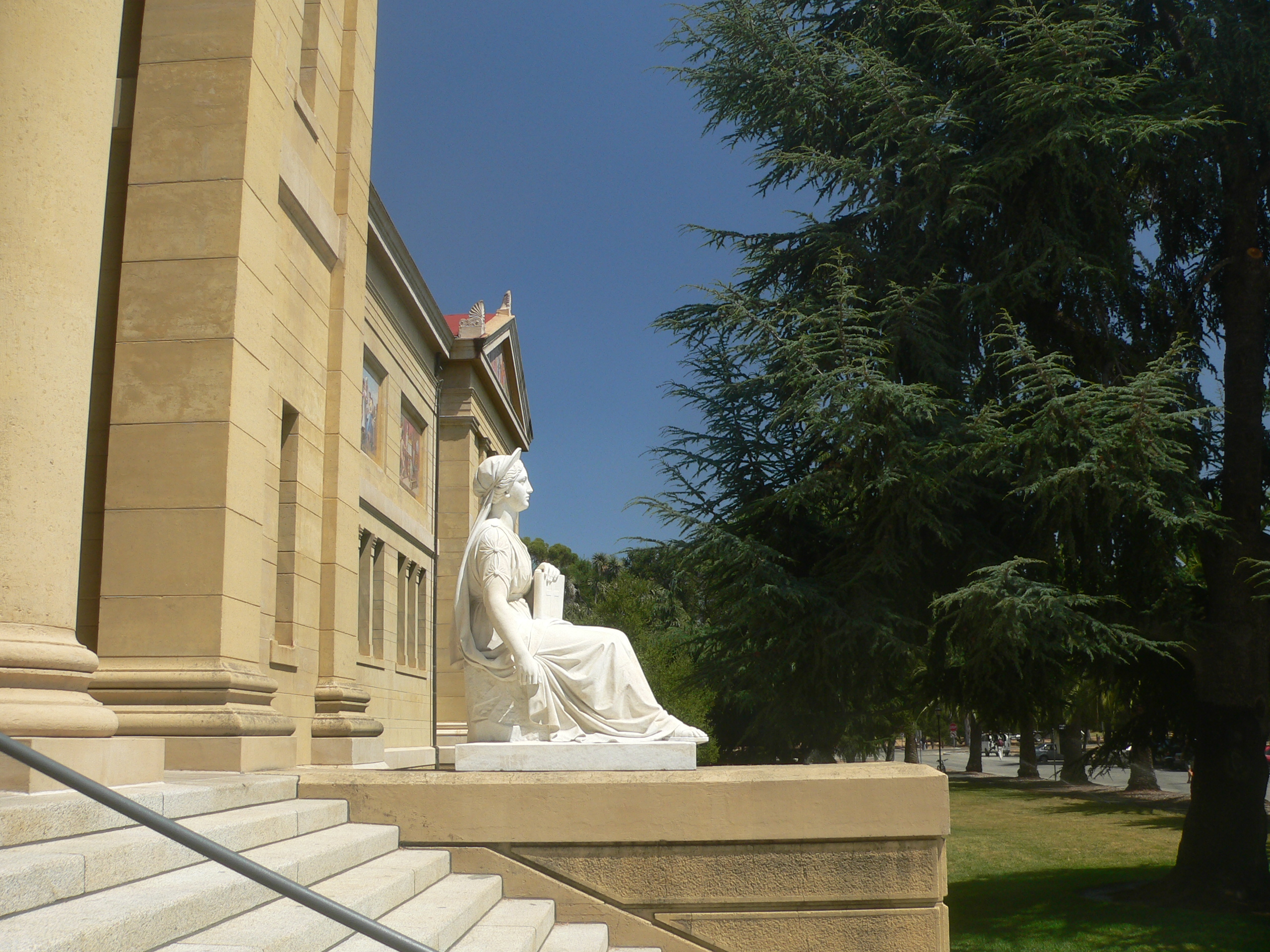
The museum's front steps

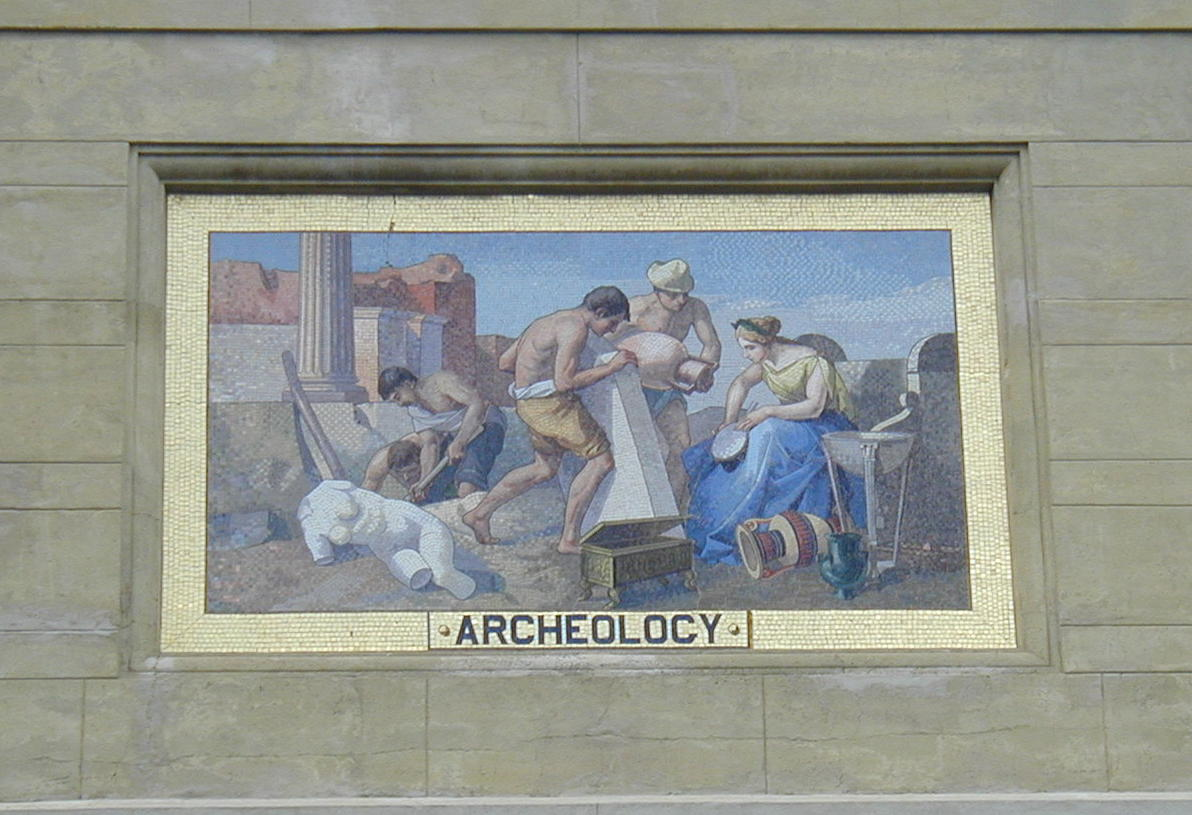
Archeology mosaic on the facade of the Cantor Arts Center

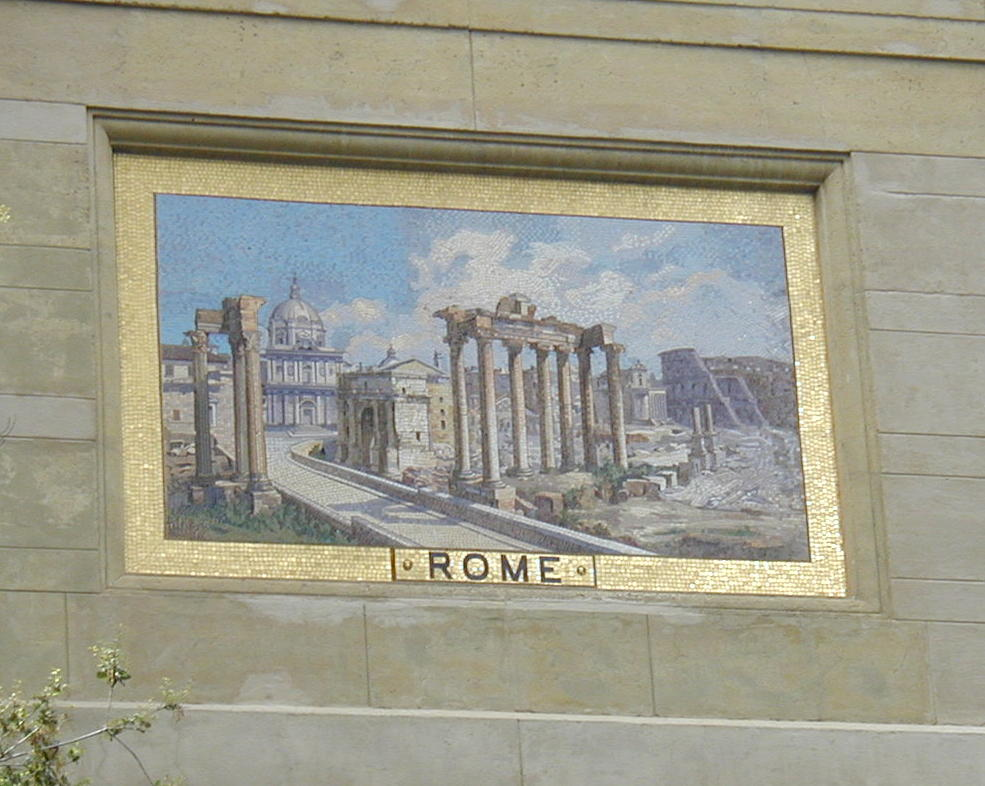
Rome mosaic on the facade of the Cantor Arts Center

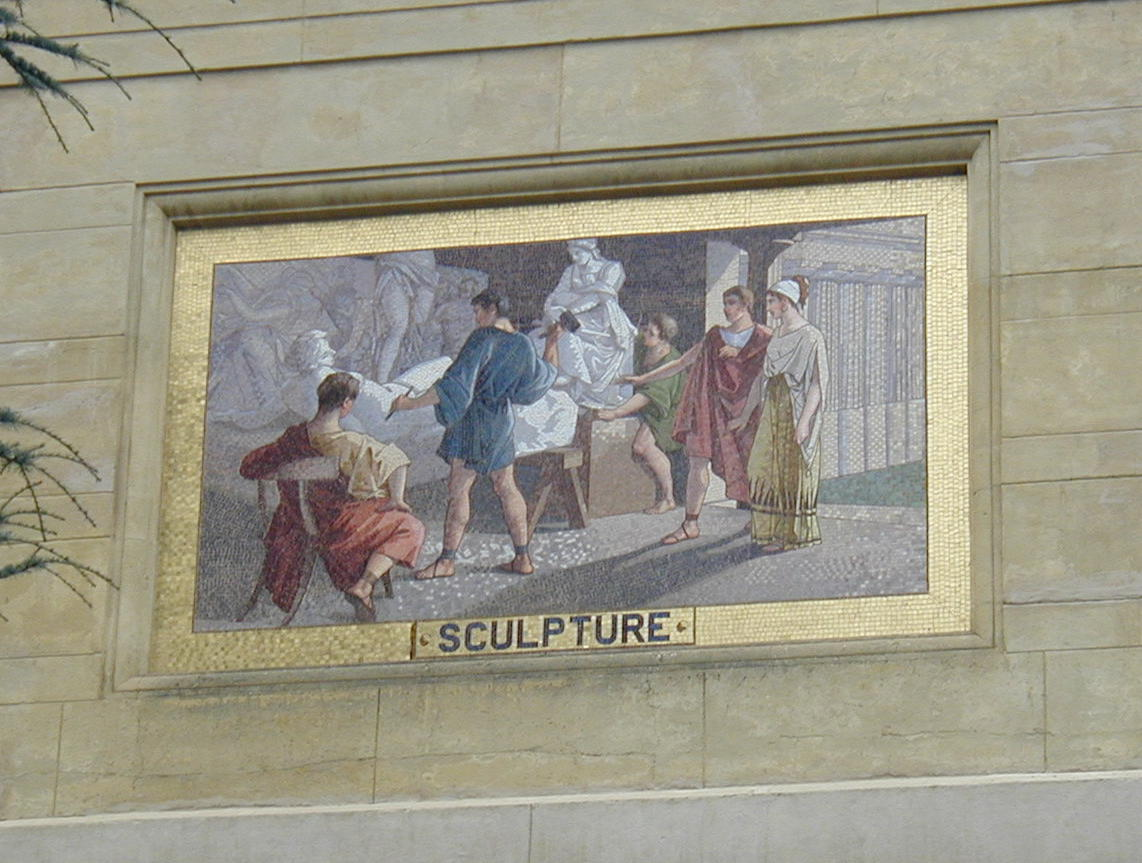
Sculpture mosaic on the facade of the Cantor Arts Center

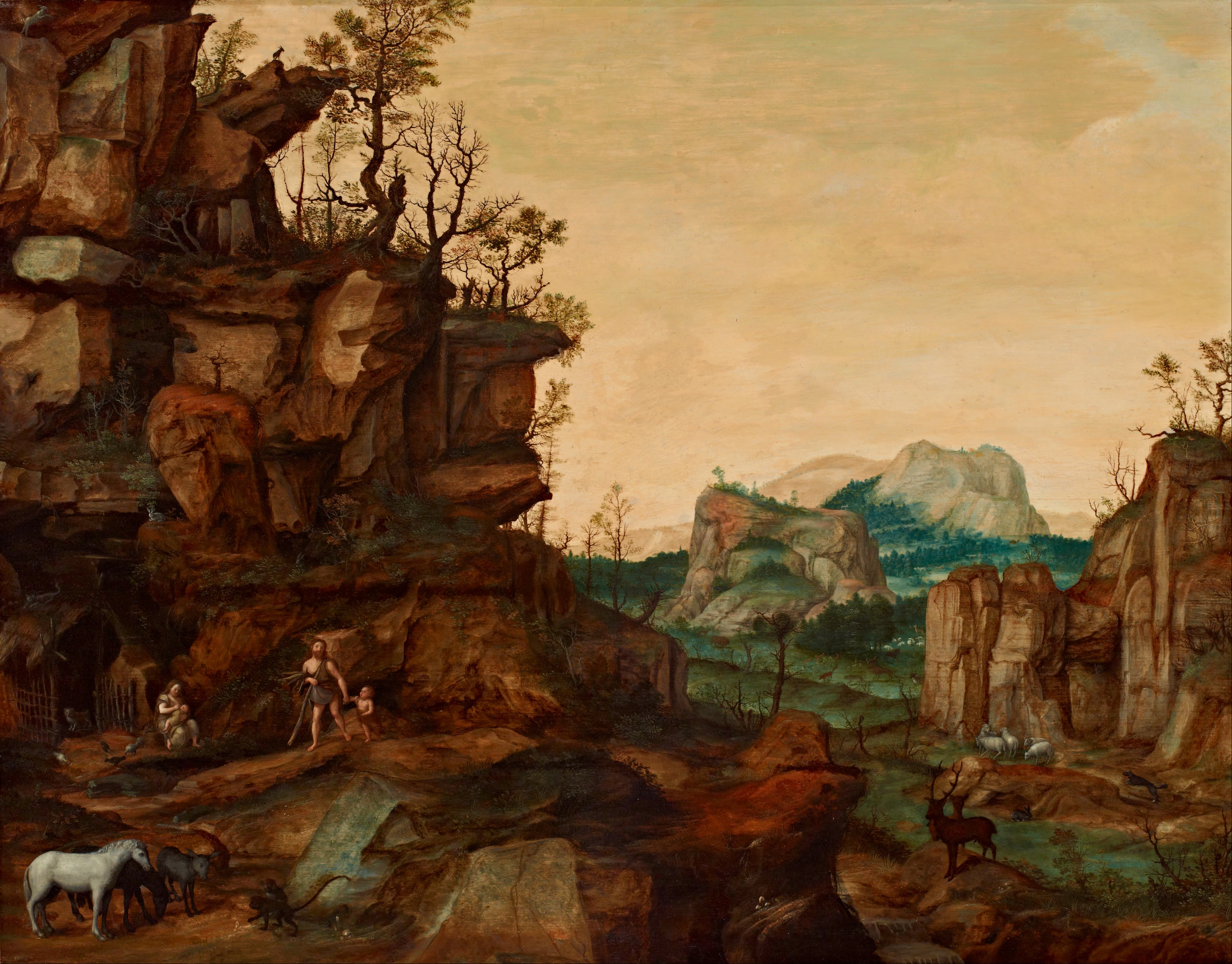
Landscape with Adam and Eve (1559-1569) by Cornelis van Dalem

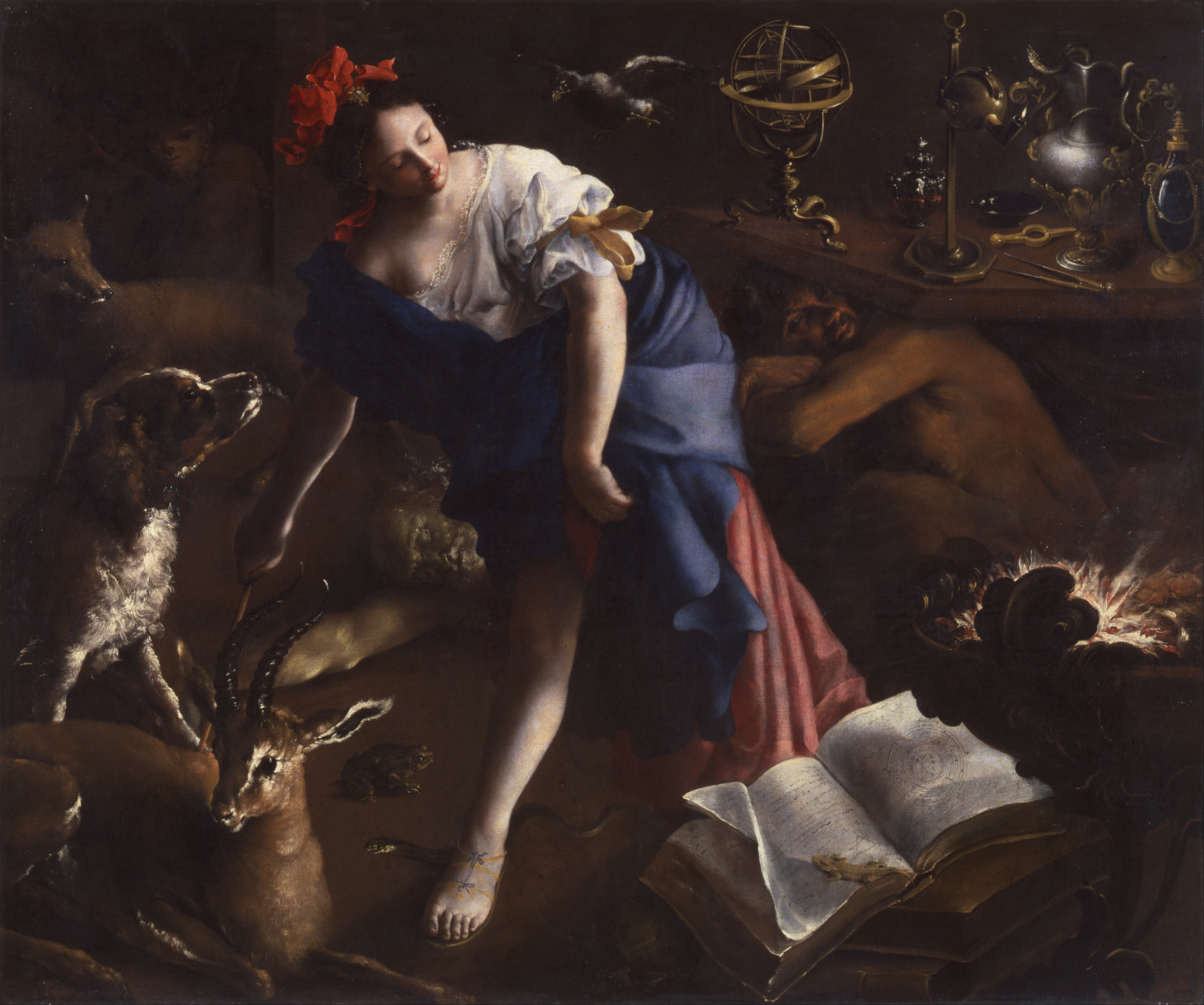
The Sorceress (1685-1695) by Bartolomeo Guidobono

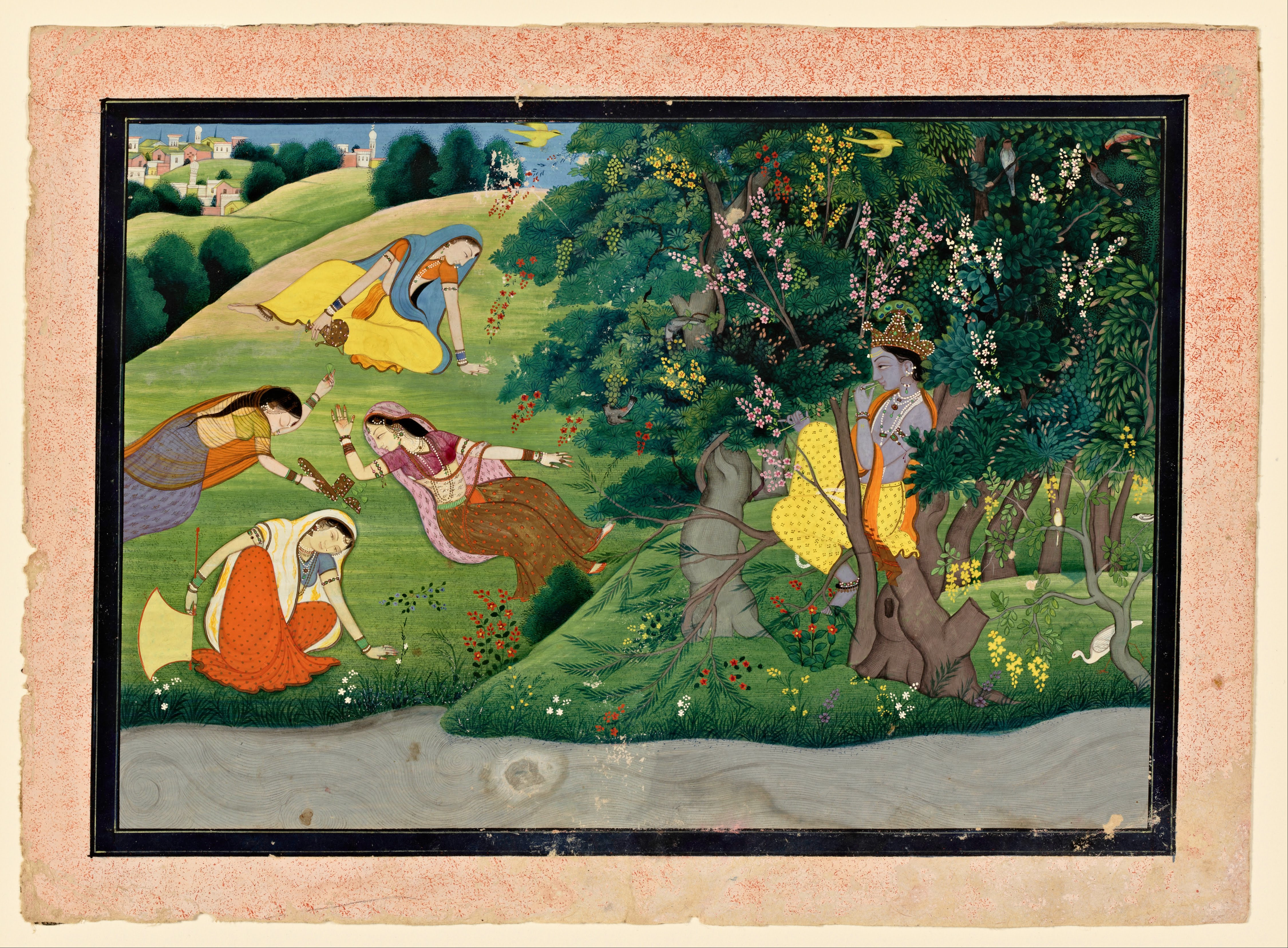
Krishna Fluting to the Milkmaids (1775-1785), Kangra, India

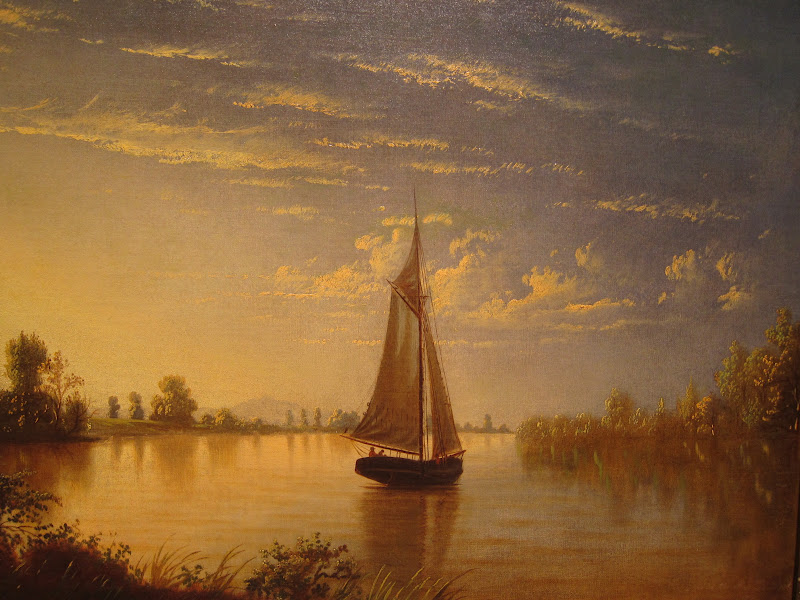
Sunset on the Sacramento River (1869) by Fortunato Arriola

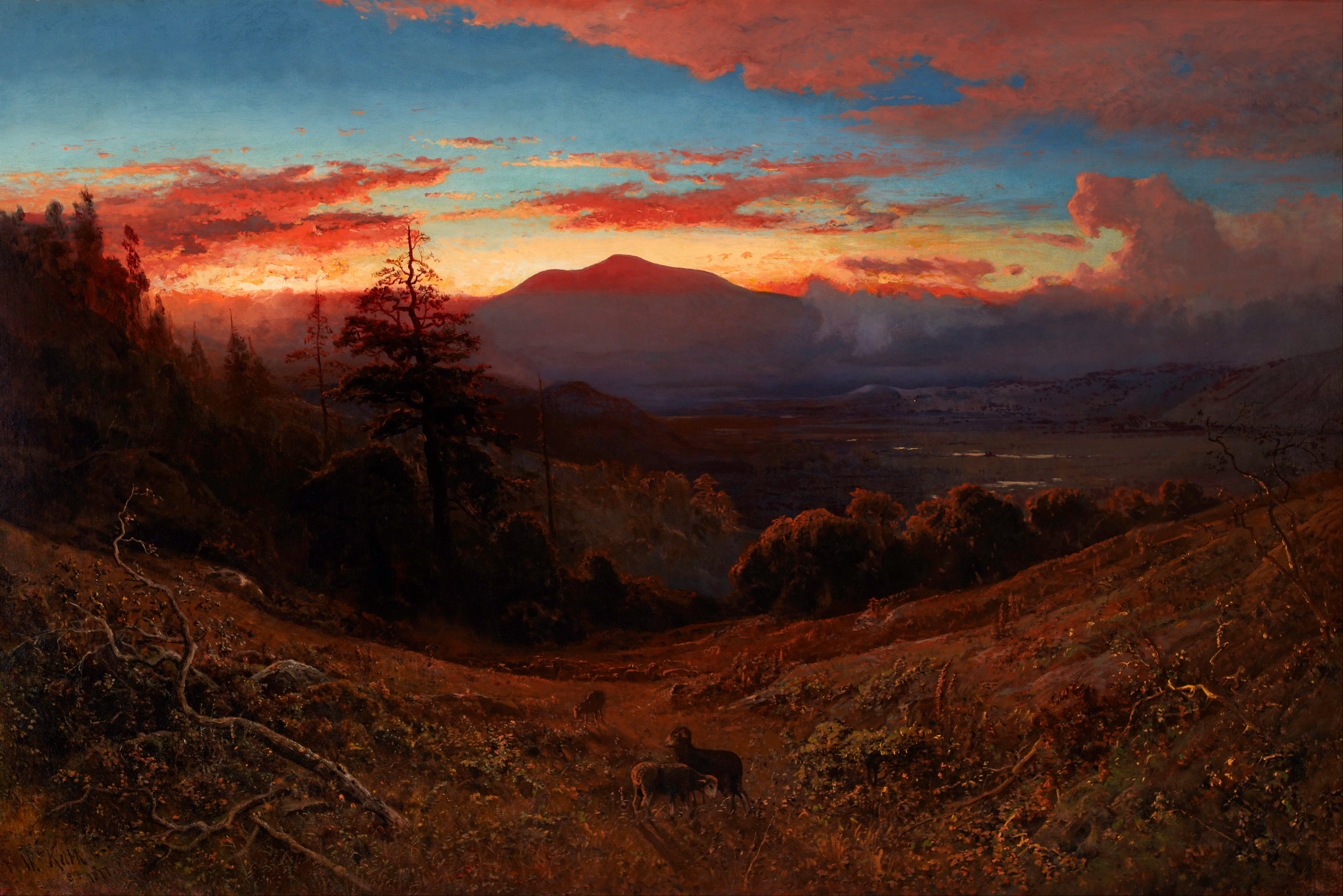
Sunset on Mount Diablo (1877) by William Keith

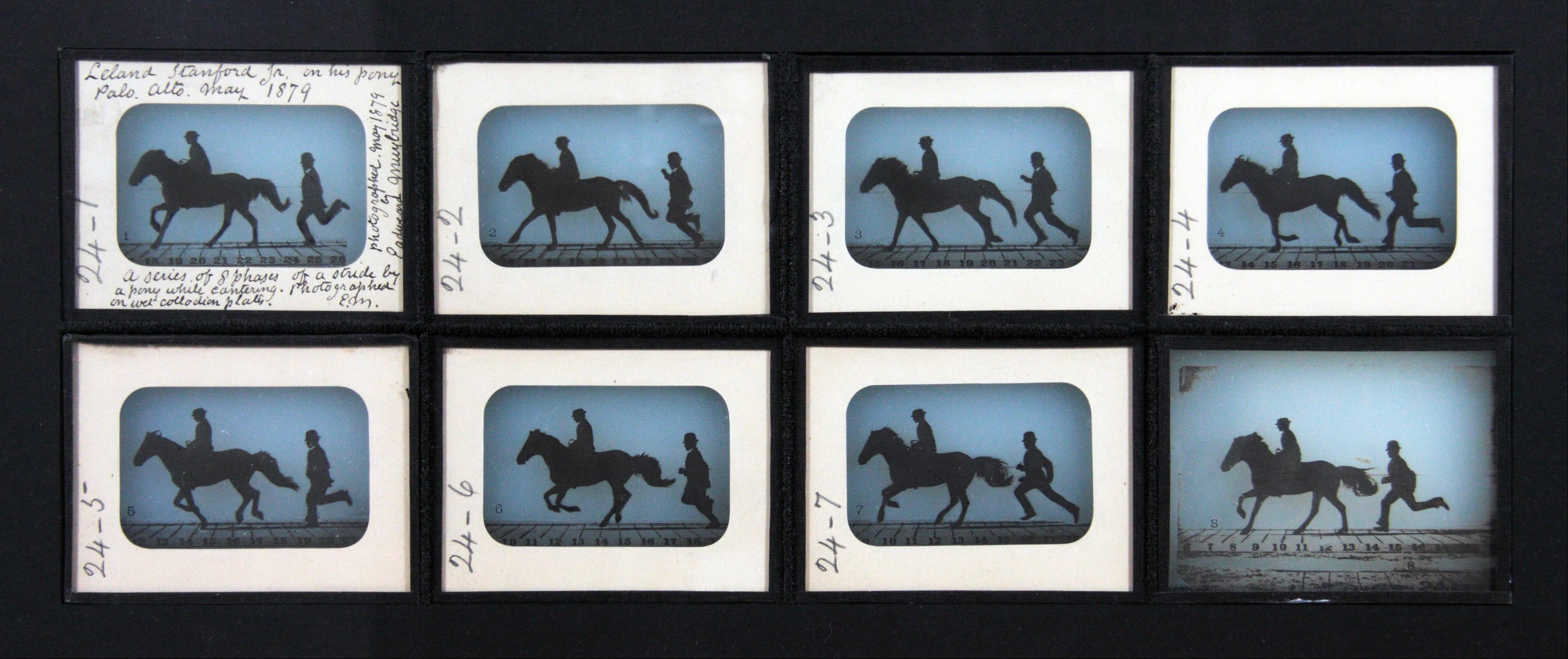
Leland Stanford Jr. on his Pony "Gypsy" (1879) by Eadweard Muybridge

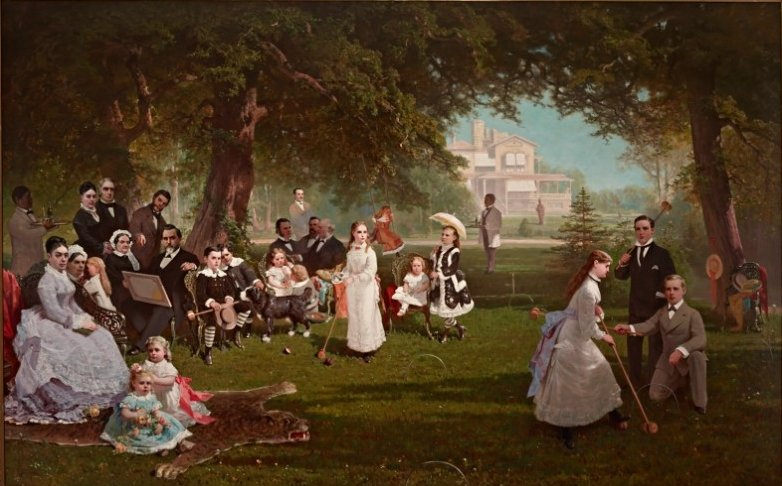
Palo Alto Spring (1879) by Thomas Hill, showing the Stanford family

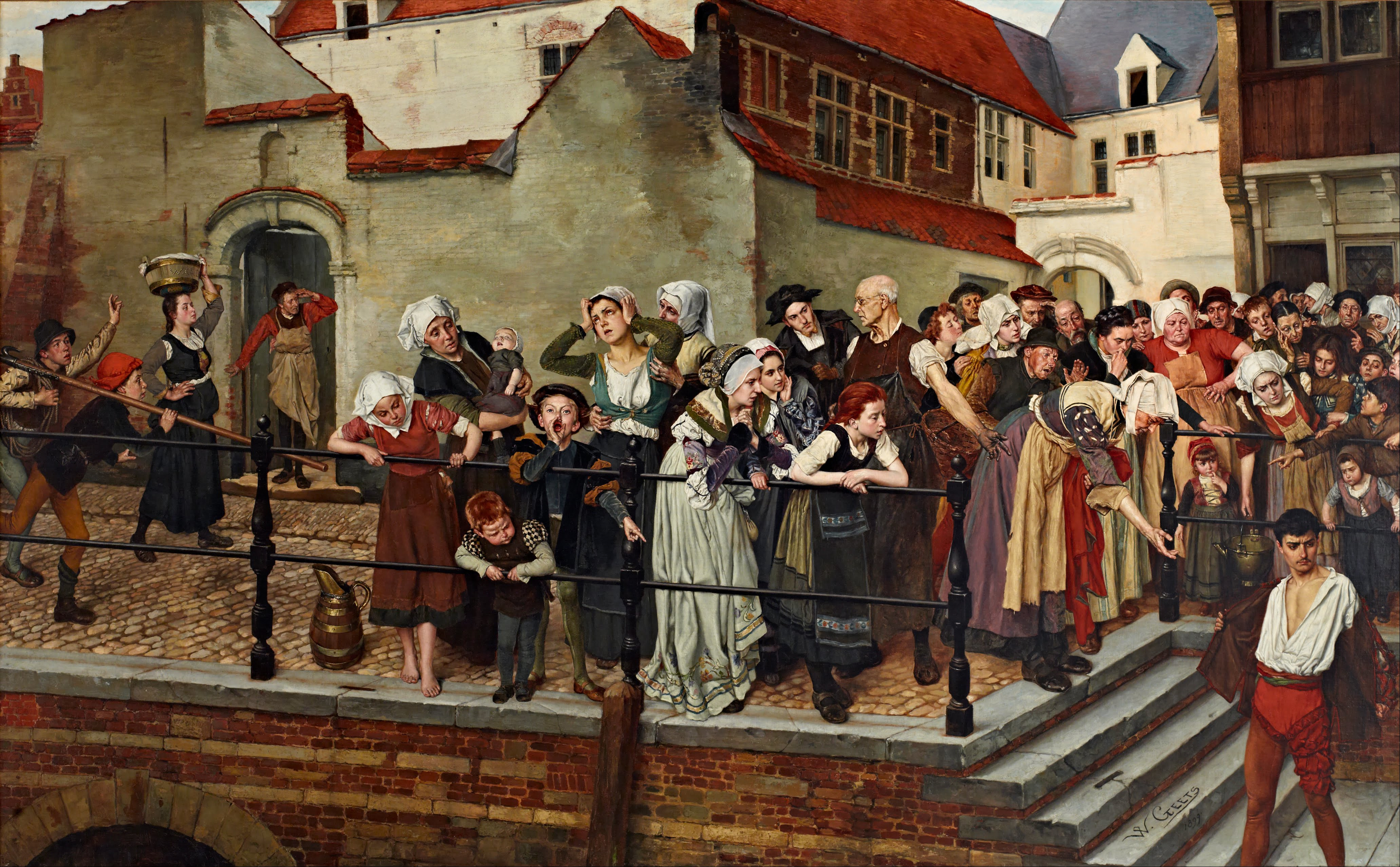
The Accident (1899) by Willem Geets

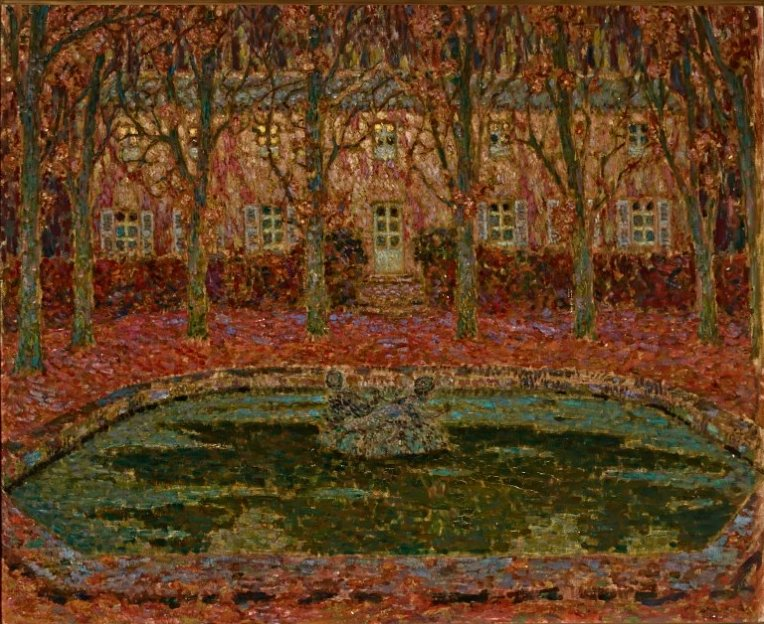
The Garden of the Gerberoy House (c. 1902–1916) by Henri Le Sidaner

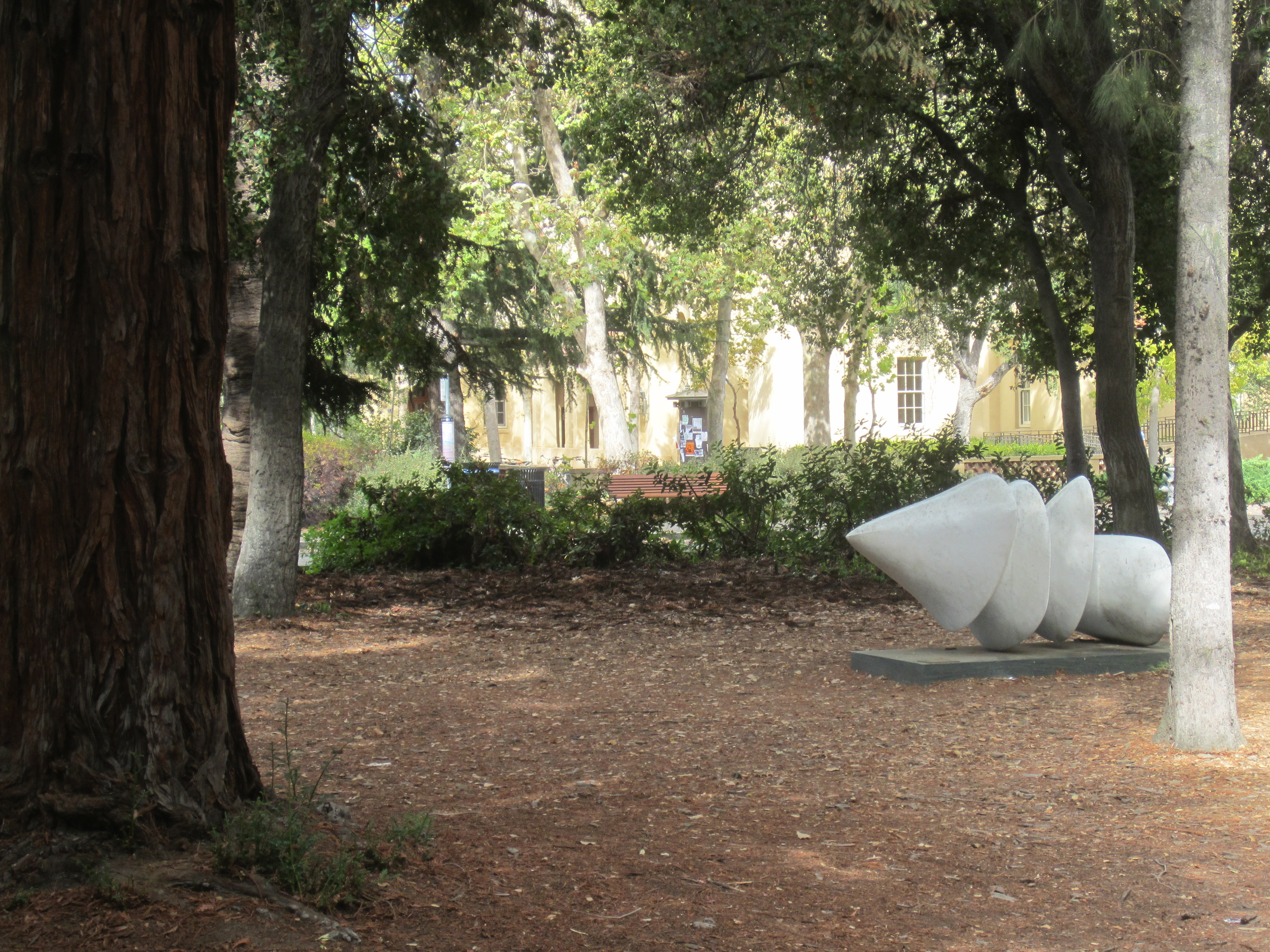
Retrofutée (1969) by Antoine Poncet, one of the Cantor's numerous outdoor sculptures
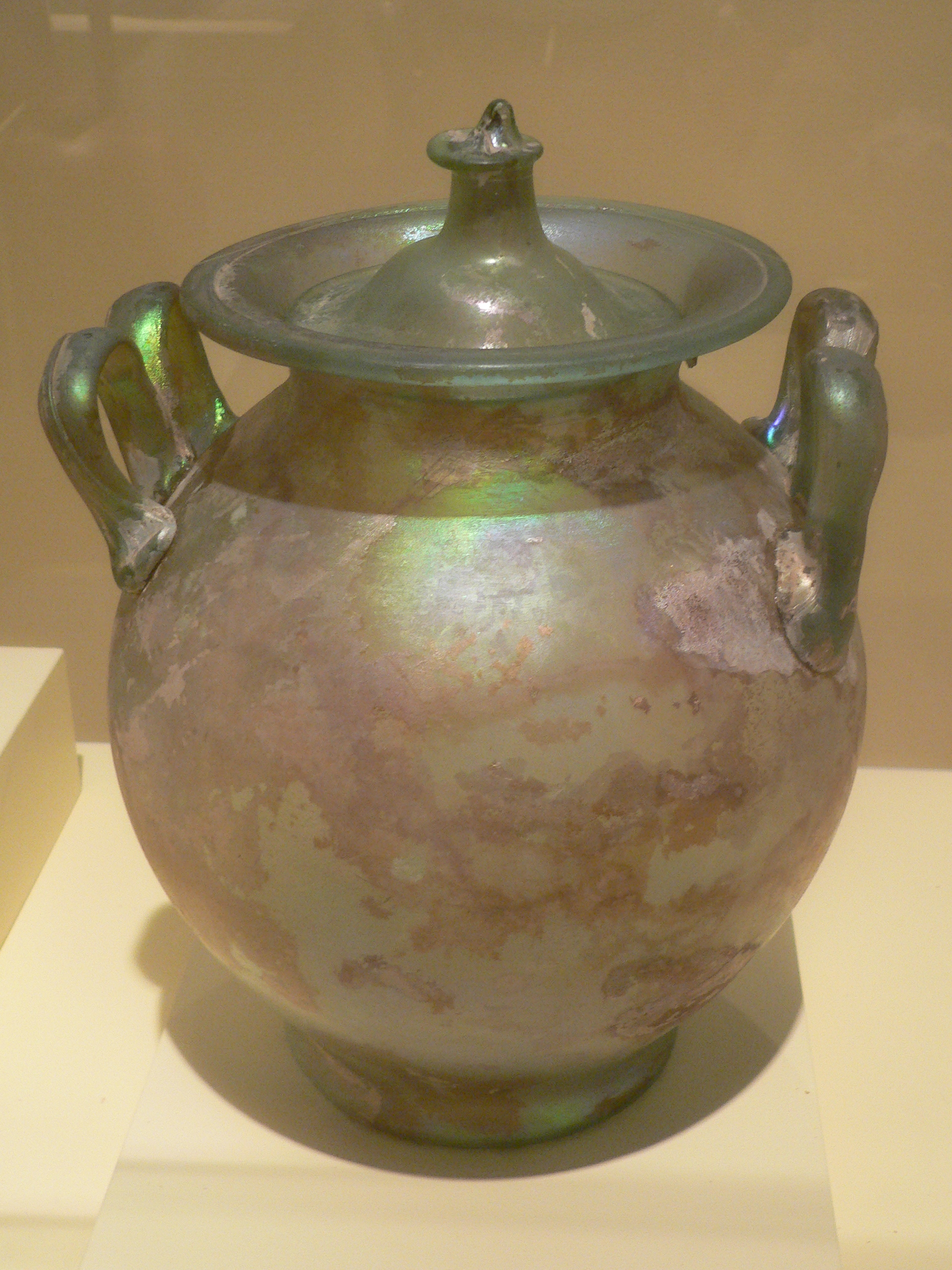
Roman period glass urn with lid (1st-2nd century), Cyprus

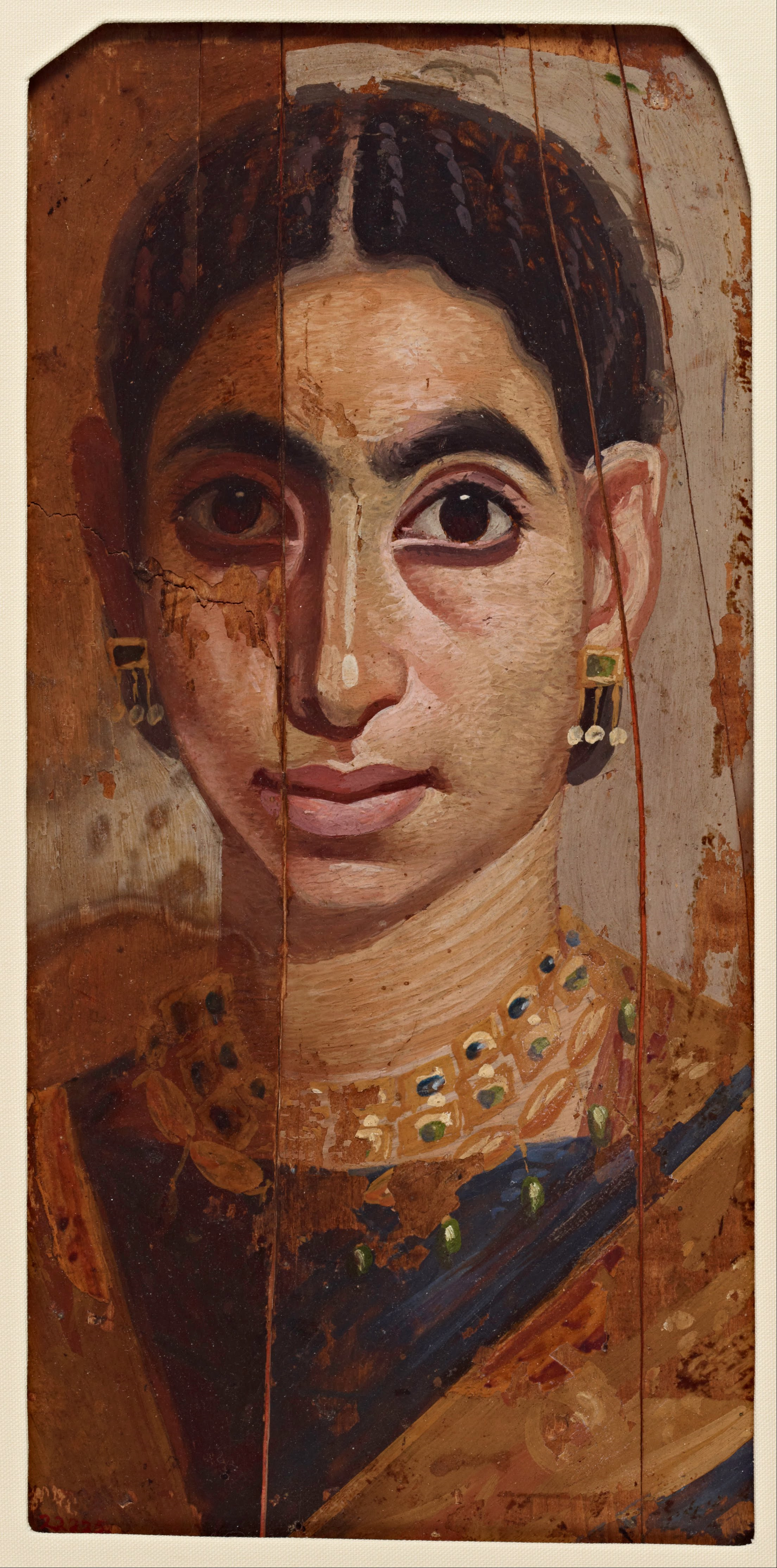
Fayum mummy portrait (2nd-3rd century), Egypt

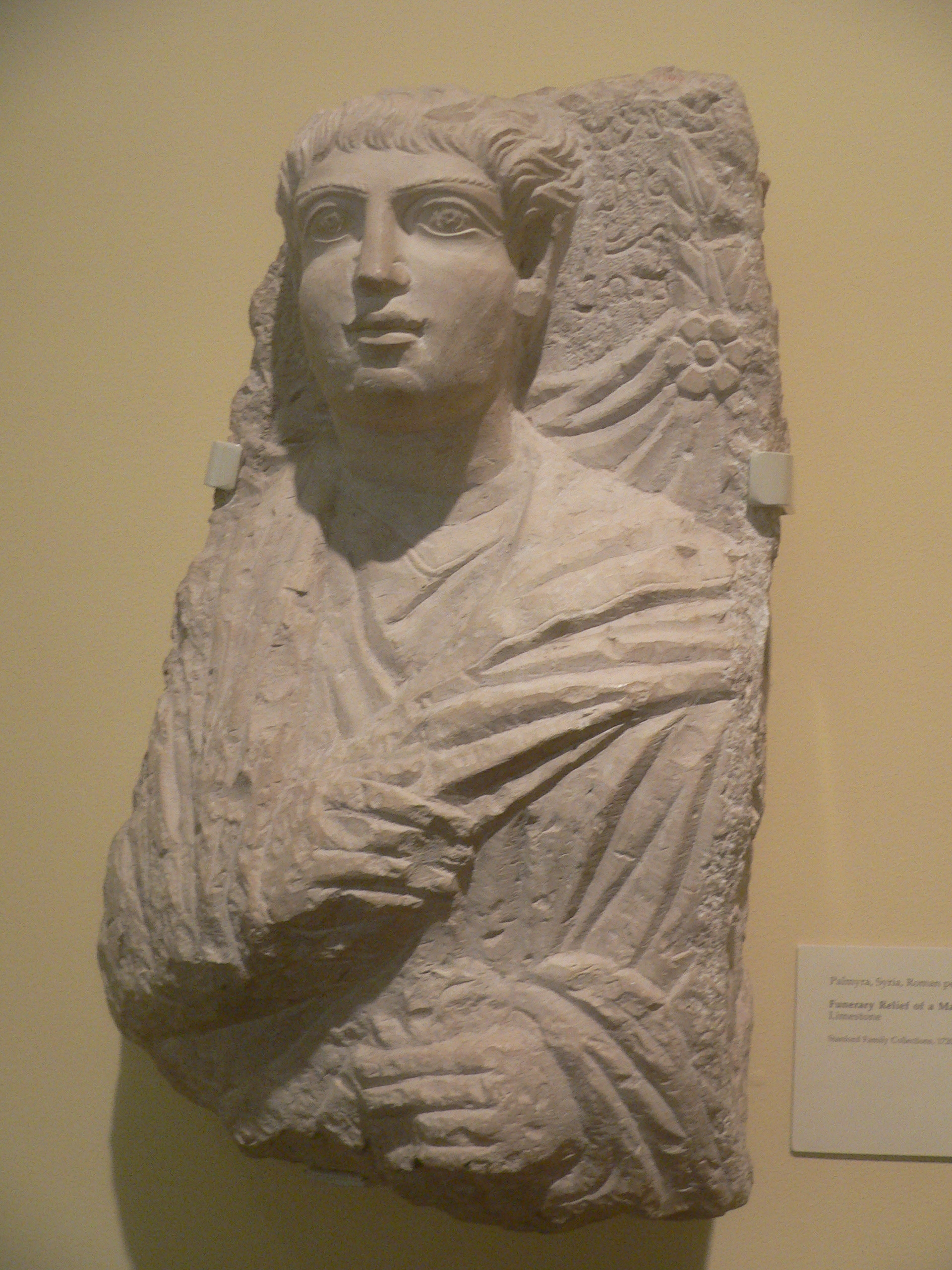
Roman period funerary relief (3rd century), Palmyra, Syria

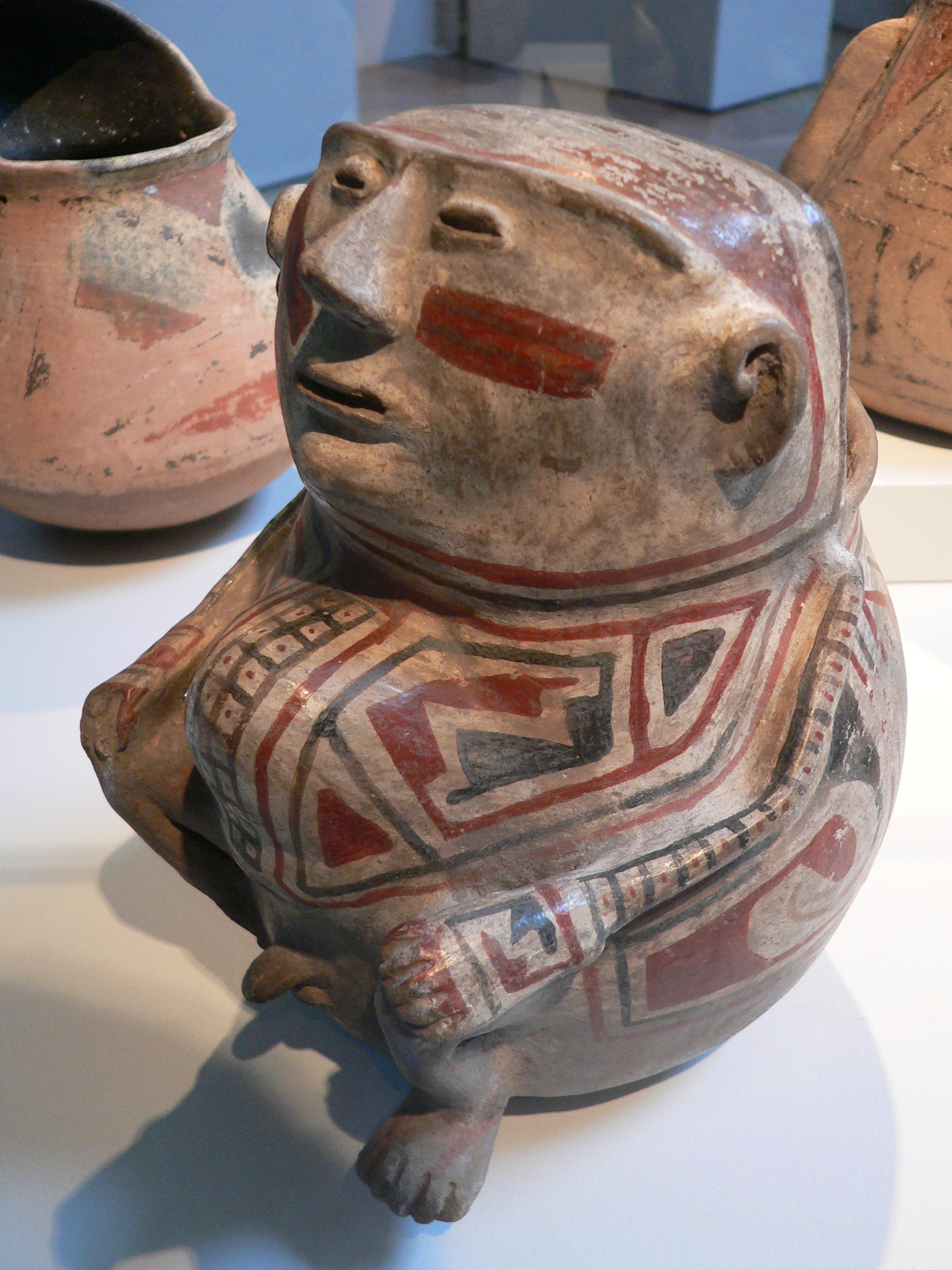
Casas Grandes ceramic vessel (14th-15th century), Mexico

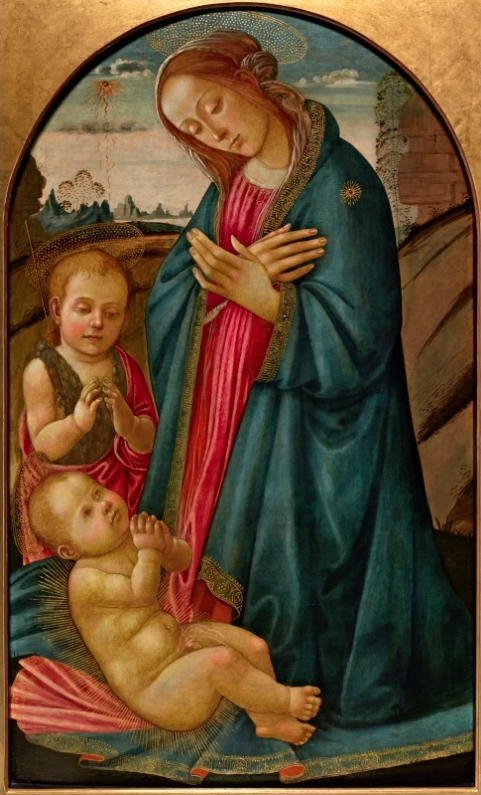
The Virgin, Child, and Saint John (c.1480-1485) by Jacopo del Sellaio

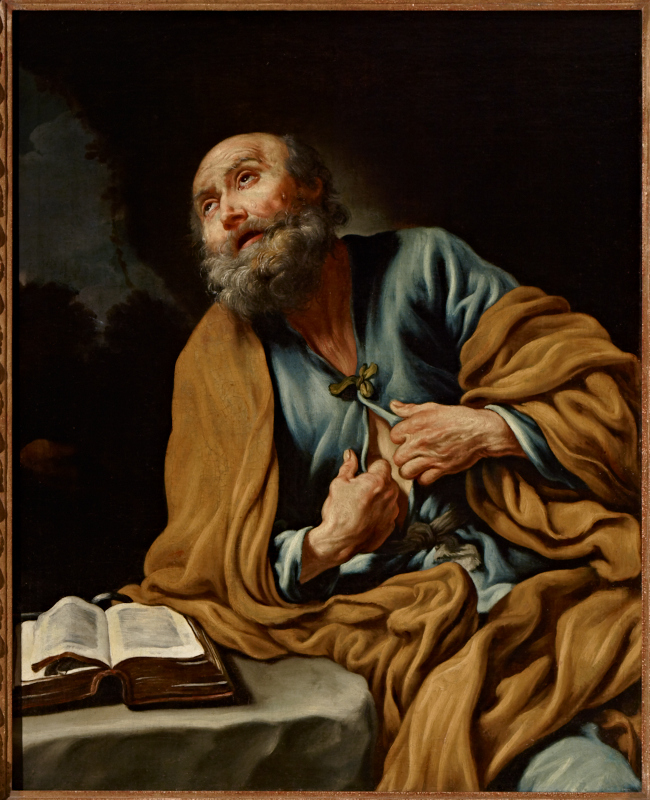
Saint Peter (1623-1630) by Claude Vignon

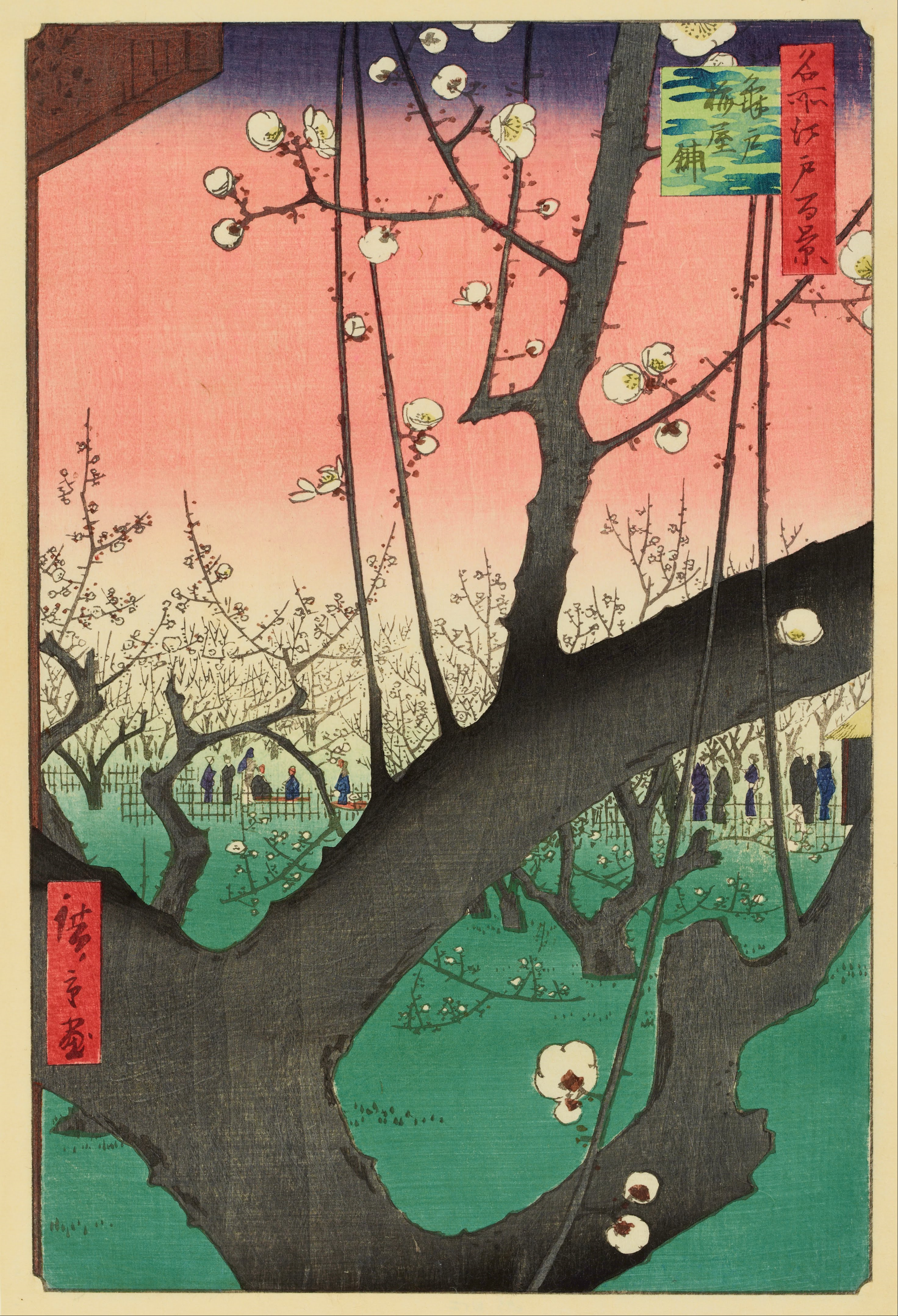
Plum Garden, Kameido (1857) by Ando Hiroshige

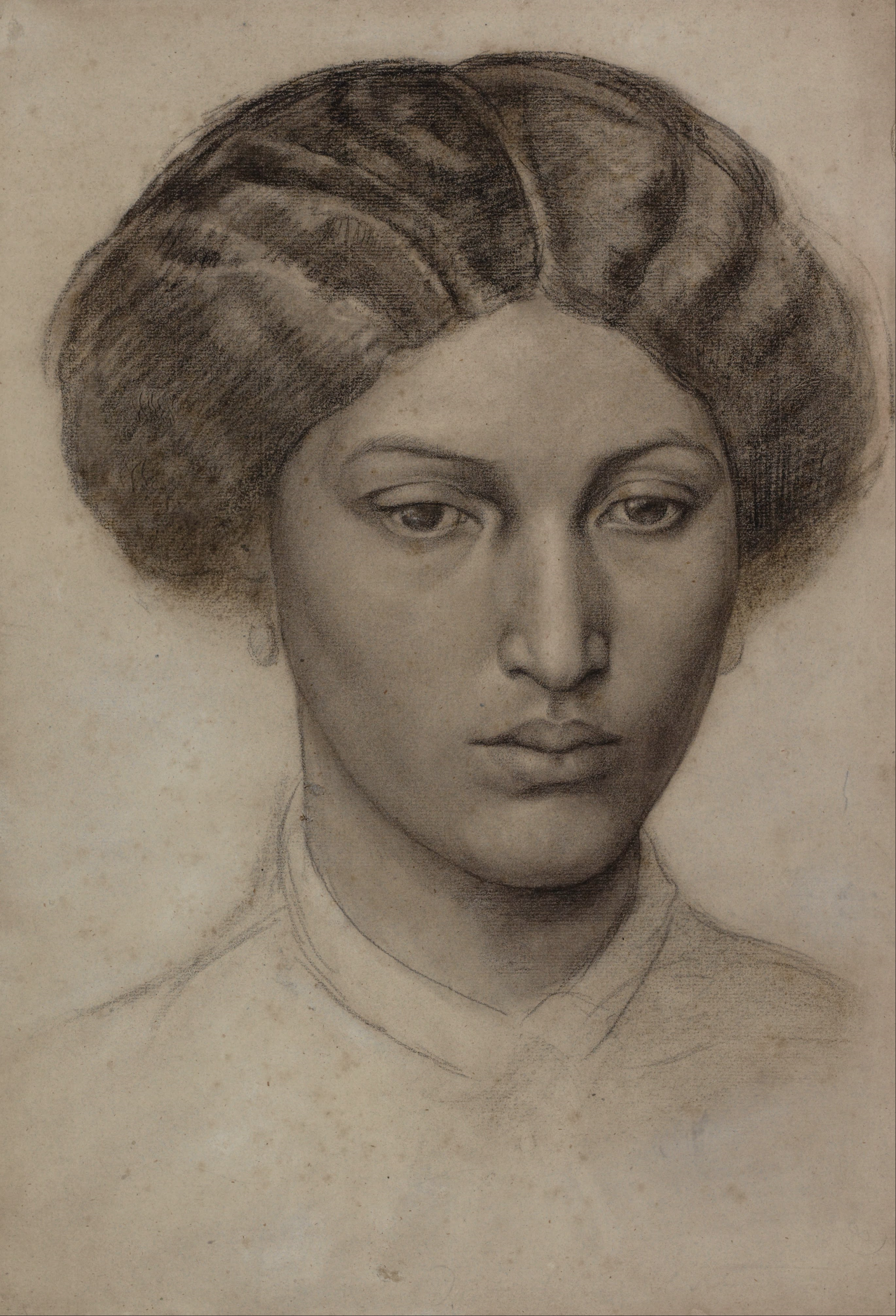
Head of a Young Woman (1863-1865) by Dante Gabriel Rossetti

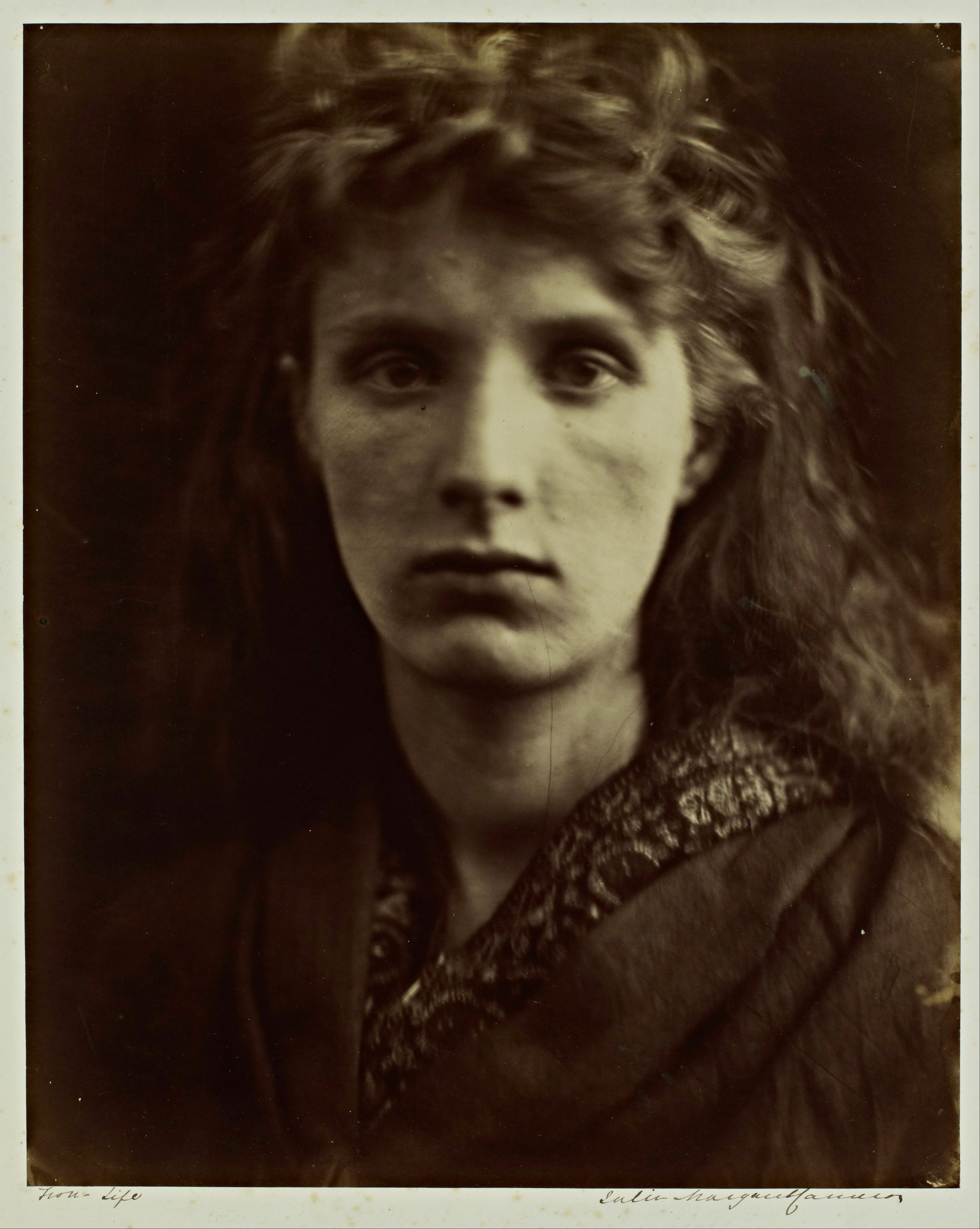
The Mountain Nymph, Sweet Liberty (1866) by Julia Margaret Cameron

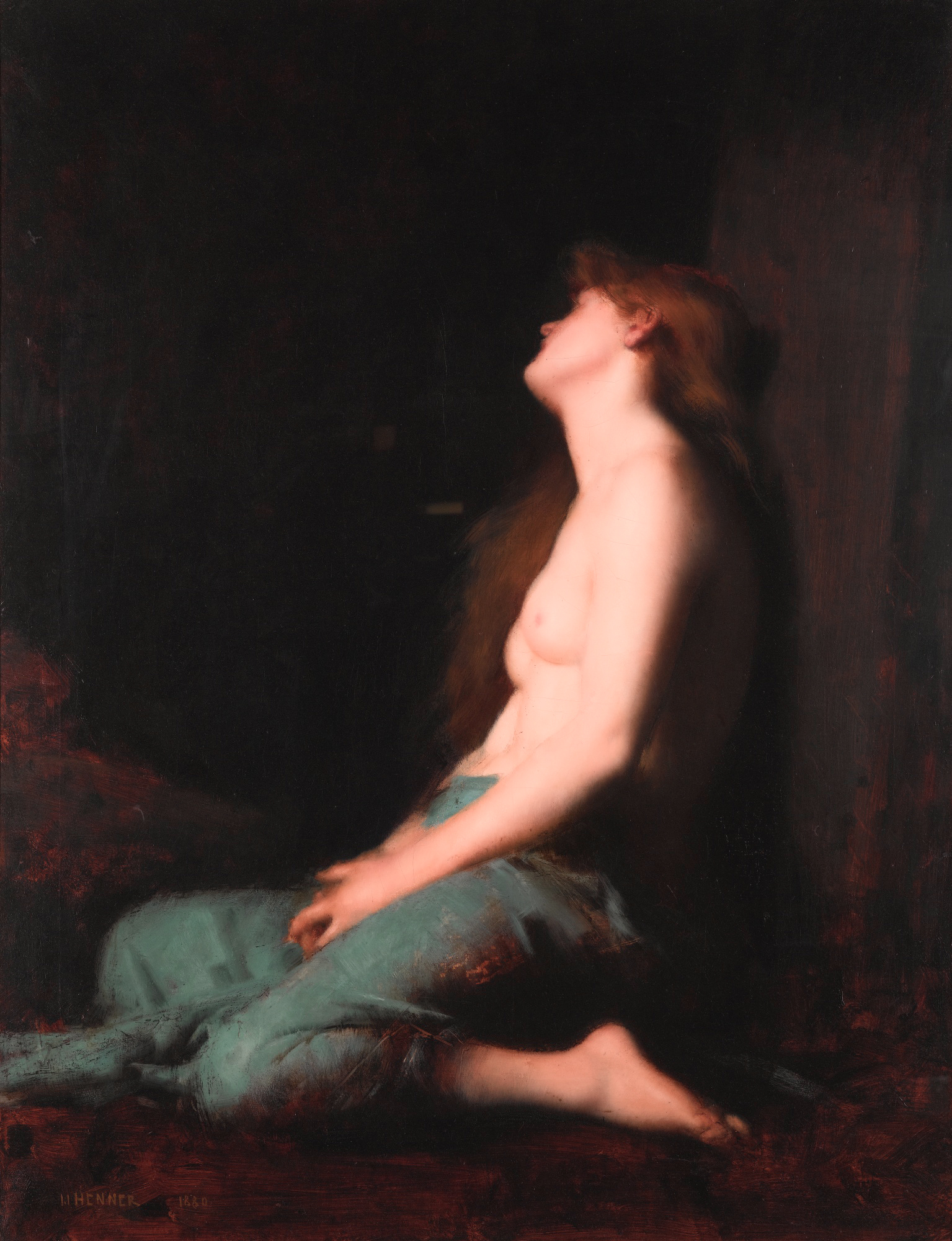
Solitude or Penitent Magdalen (c. 1881) by Jean-Jacques Henner

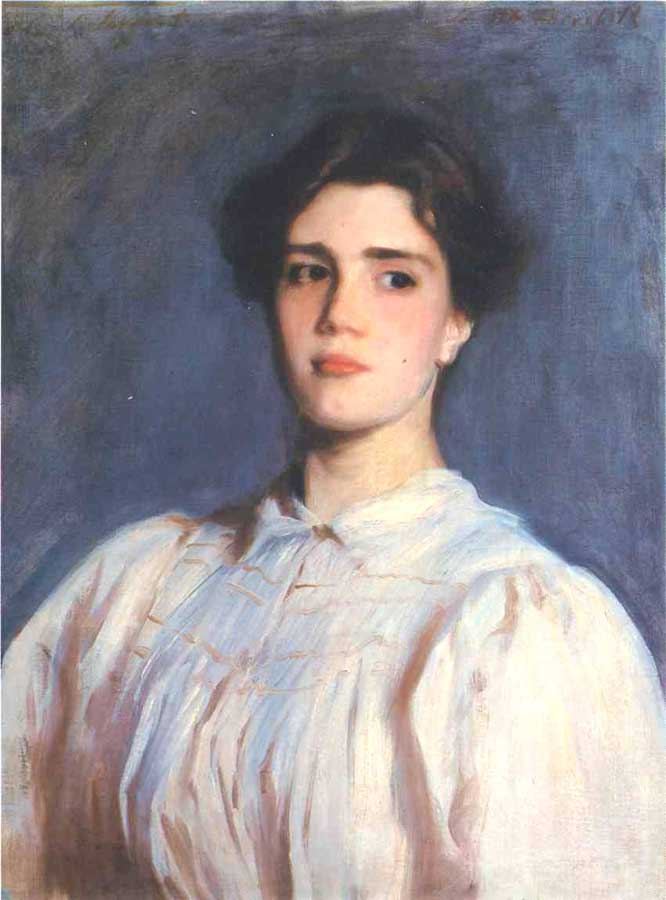
Portrait of Sally Fairchild (1884-1887) by John Singer Sargent
