= Lorenz Eitner =

Professor Lorenz Eitner
- Born: August 27, 1919; Brno (Moravia-Silesia, Czechoslovakia)
- Died: March 11, 2009 (aged 89); Stanford, California
- Citizenship: American
- Children: 3

Lorenz Edwin Alfred Eitner (27 August 1919 – 11 March 2009) was an art historian and museum director of the Stanford University Museum of Art. He served in the Office of Strategic Services, and, after World War II ended, provided materials for the Ministries Trial and the Judges' Trial. His research interest focused on the work of French Romantic artist Théodore Géricault (1791–1824).

== Early life ==
Lorenz Edwin Alfred Eitner was born on August 27, 1919, in Brno, Czechoslovakia, to Katherina (née Thonet) and William Eitner, who were Austrians. William Eitner was a doctor of law, though never practised, born in Vienna in 1884; prior to World War I, he worked in an Austrian ministry. His parents married after the war. His mother, born from an Austrian father and American mother, was from a family of industrialist makers of bentwood furniture. Tubular steel was added to the business by his father.

He was baptized as a Catholic, but his family was not particularly observant. His younger brother by two years was named Wolfgang.

The family moved several times for business. After moving from Brno, they lived in West Berlin, in a largely Jewish quarter; the vast majority of his early childhood friends were Jewish. His first Gymnasium was named Helderschule, after the poet, and he immensely disliked it. They moved to Frankfurt, and he attended Goethe-Gymnasium, which he liked much more, and whose principal was Jewish. They left Frankfurt in 1934 and moved to Brussels. He went to the German School, which was undergoing Nazification ineptly, because the teachers were new to it.

As a child, Eitner enjoyed collecting things, particularly propaganda posters and leaflets. His father confiscated his poster collection when they arrived in America. In 1935, the family moved to Florence, South Carolina, where his father managed a factory of the Thonet firm and he attended Florence High School. There was ambiguity over whether the family would remain in America, but in 1938, Austria was occupied, and his parents did not want him to be drafted into the Germany military, so they remained in America, where they would later become naturalized citizens.

He received his bachelor's degree in English literature from Duke University in 1940. He did not intend to pursue English literature as a career; he was interested in art history even then. He was the editor of The Archive, the local monthly. At recommendation from his teachers, he went to Princeton University, which he was disappointed by, as they specialized exclusively in early medieval art.

== Office of Strategic Services and Nuremberg Trials ==
Eitner was drafted into the United States military in 1943 as a non-citizen enemy alien. He was required to submit his short-wave radio to the local policy station. He trained as a combat engineer in Fort Belvoir, Virginia. He applied for his citizenship during that time, and was granted it. He remained on "garbage jobs" for some time.

The Office of Strategic Services, predecessor of the CIA, recruited, and he attended the speech of a Colonel talking about unsung heroes who would likely lose their lives but would win the war- secret operations. He was accompanied by Courtlandt Canby, a musicologist Eitner met at Princeton. Eitner remained to talk to Canby, and Canby revealed that the OSS was actually recruiting for research and analysis, and that the wrong speech had been given. Eitner joined the division, focusing on Central Europe.

He was initially stationed in Washington, D.C., then transferred to London, then Paris after Capture of Paris. His work there was largely devoted to spotting resistance movements. In May of 1945, he was flown to Salzburg, where he worked in what had been Gestapo headquarters before. The OSS office worked with the military government of Austria in denazification, where he worked to detect and dismantle remaining Nazi organizations. The political situation was tense, and American military government dealt with it ineptly; many did not even speak German, and so Eitner's fluency in it and knowledge of Austria's situation was very valuable.

He was head analyst for the Ministries Division of the Office of Chief of Counsel, starting in August 1946. In this capacity, he was called as a witness on March 24, 1947, for the Judges' Trial, where he testified on Curt Rothenberger's signature; on April 22, he was called in to testify on other officials' signatures.

== Return to the US ==
After his education being interrupted by World War II, Eitner returned to Princeton University in 1947, finishing his doctorate in 1952. He became a professor at the University of Minnesota in 1949 and taught for fourteen years.

His first daughter, Maria "Christy" was born on September 27, 1947, and Eitner planted a sapling taken from the shores of Lake Carnegie on 221C Halsey Street, Princeton, that same day. He would have two more daughters, Katherina and Claudia.

== Stanford University Museum of Art ==
He was made the Osgood Hooker Professor of Fine Art Emeritus at Stanford University.

Eitner was concurrently installed as the chair of the departments of art and of architecture of Stanford University Museum of Art in 1963. He significantly revived the museum from its slump from the 1906 earthquake; this was done by refurbishing galleries, strengthening collections, and instituting a program of exhibitions, educational services, and publications.

Eitner used Stanford University's lack of care about the museum to act decisively, allowing fast purchases of art items. This, in conjunction with fundraising from a variety of small benefits, allowed the museum to flourish.

"He realized he didn't have the money to buy de Koonings and Pollocks, but he knew the market very well and bought against the market, very anticipatorily, with the funds that he had" - Robert Flynn Johnson on Eitner's museum management practices.

Eitner retired in 1989, two months before the Loma Prieta earthquake closed the museum for ten years.

== Later life ==
After his retirement, Eitner worked on his autobiography. This would focus on his time in the Office of Strategic Services and his work for the Nuremberg Trials.

On March 11, 2009, Eitner died of a heart attack. He was survived by his wife of 62 years, Gertrude.

== Awards ==
- Fulbright Fellow (1952–53) in Brussels
- Guggenheim Fellow (1956–57) in Munich
- National Endowment for the Humanities Research Grant
- Mitchell Prize for the History of Art (for his Géricault research)
- Charles Rufus Morey Book Award of the College Art Association
- Member of the American Academy of Arts and Sciences (1988)
- Stanford's Gores Award for Excellence in Teaching (1986)
- Golden Decoration of Honor for services to the Republic of Austria (1990)

== Works ==
- Géricault's 'Raft of the Medusa' (1972)
- Géricault: His Life and Works (1983)
- Theodore Gericault (1987)
- French Paintings of the Nineteenth Century (National Gallery of Art, 2000)
- 19th Century European Painting: David to Cézanne (Westview Press, 2002)

== See also ==
Testimony of Lorenz Eitner. iwitness.usc.edu. USC Shoah Foundation. Retrieved 2023-03-01.
