= Dave Feldman =

American sportscaster

Dave Feldman (born 1965) is an American sportscaster. Formerly at ESPN and WTTG-TV in Washington, D.C., Feldman began his current position as reporter and television anchor for Comcast SportsNet Bay Area in San Francisco, California on July 23, 2012.

== Career ==
Feldman was hired by CSN Bay Area to serve as anchor/reporter for the network's San Francisco 49ers programming and the network's regular studio show SportsNet Central, including pre- and post-game shows for Major League Baseball, NBA basketball and NHL hockey broadcasts.

Prior to his move to CSN Bay Area, Feldman spent 12 years as sports director and sports anchor for WTTG-TV FOX 5 in Washington, D.C. He joined WTTG in August 2000 as sports anchor and reporter and had been its sports director as well since January 2001, while also announcing college basketball games for Mid-Atlantic Sports Network. During his tenure with WTTG, Feldman won five local Emmy Awards, including three for Best Sports Anchor.

Feldman's broadcasting career began in 1987 at KCBS 740 radio in San Francisco. His first television job was at KTIV in Sioux City, Iowa beginning in 1988, after which he was at KMST (now KION) in Monterey, California before moving on to the Orange County Newschannel in Santa Ana, California. In 1996 Feldman was hired by ESPN, where he would remain for four years. He was the primary host of College Hoops 2Night on ESPN2, and filled in such other roles as hosting SportsCenter and ESPNews, as well as play-by-play duties for college basketball.

== Background ==
Dave Feldman is a 1983 graduate of Palo Alto High School in Palo Alto, California, where he played two years of varsity basketball and was a teammate of future NFL football player and coach Jim Harbaugh. He earned a Bachelor of Arts in English from Tufts University, where he again was a two-year varsity basketball player. Before entering broadcasting, Feldman was an assistant basketball coach at Stanford University. Feldman is Jewish.
