= David B. Feldman =

American psychologist

Academic background
- Education: DePauw University (BA); University of Kansas (PhD)

Academic work
- Discipline: Psychology
- Institutions: Santa Clara University

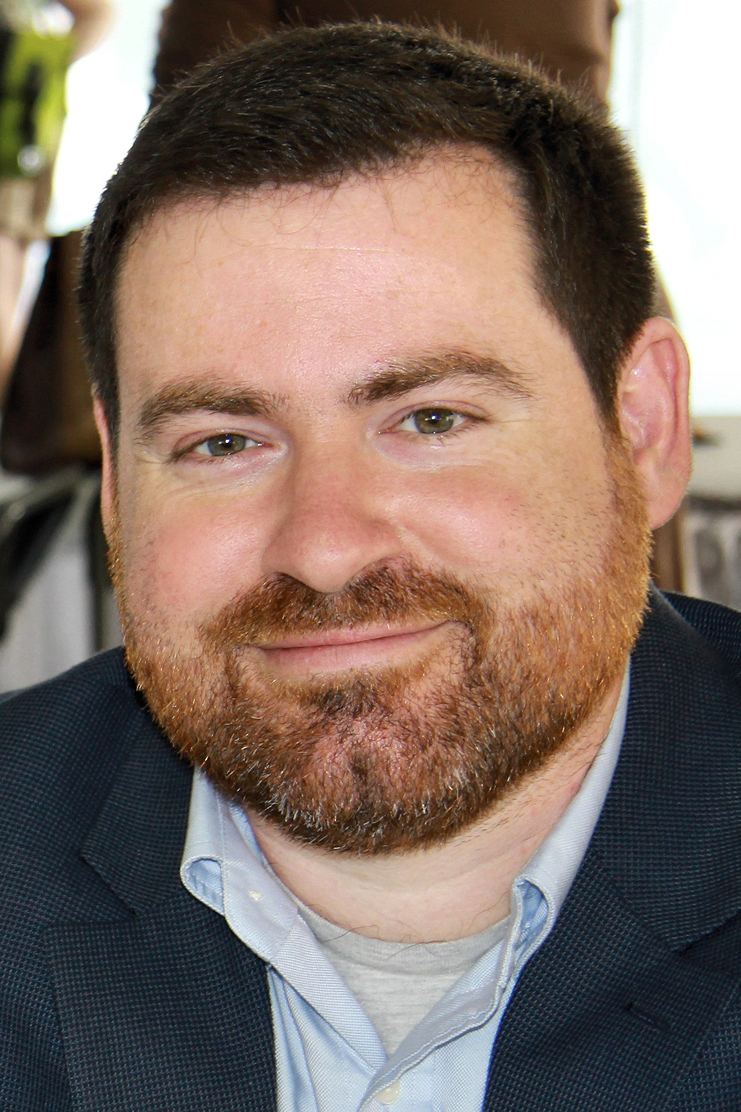
Feldman in 2014

David B. Feldman is an American psychologist who is a full professor of psychology at Santa Clara University. His research focuses on hope, meaning, and growth in the face of life's difficulties, and he has been instrumental in developing Hope Therapy and applying it to various populations.

== Education and academic career ==
Feldman received a bachelor's degree from DePauw University and a Ph.D. in clinical psychology (2004) from the University of Kansas. He completed his post-doctoral fellowship in health psychology at the VA Palo Alto Health Care System (2004-2005).

Feldman has been a professor (2005–present) at Santa Clara University's graduate department of Counseling Psychology. Additionally, Feldman has taught in Santa Clara University's Center for Professional Development (2006–present), a continuing education program. Feldman has held supervision positions at the VA Palo Alto Health Care System (2004-2005) and the University of Kansas (2000-2003). During the 2025-26 academic year, he was awarded a visiting adjunct professorship in the faculty of psychology at Chulalongkorn University in Bangkok, Thailand.

== Awards and accolades ==
- “Great Psychology Book” of the month by all-about-psychology.com for Speaking for Psychologists. (March 2010)
- Irving-Handelsman Graduate Student Teaching Award, University of Kansas (2002)
- During the 2025-26 academic year, he was awarded a visiting adjunct professorship in the faculty of psychology at Chulalongkorn University in Bangkok, Thailand. This position is described by Chulalongkorn’s Office of Research Affairs as fostering “long-term collaboration with renowned international experts…to promote research, develop academic partnerships, and facilitate the exchange of knowledge and experience.”

== Research ==
Feldman's research has focused on:

- Hope: research, measurement, and treatment applications
- Maintenance and growth of hope and meaning in the face of physical illness, trauma, and other highly stressful events
- Psychological aspects of chronic and terminal medical illness
- Well-being and burnout in healthcare professionals
- Interventions derived from positive-psychology constructs

== Publications and media ==
Feldman has authored numerous articles and book chapters, as well as presented nationally and internationally. He has been interviewed in SELF, U.S. News & World Report, and Ode, has had his work featured on WebMD.com and About.com, and has appeared on national radio.

For several years, Feldman hosted a program called About Health on alternate Mondays on Pacifica Radio station KPFA-FM in Berkeley, California. He currently hosts the podcast Psychology in 10 Minutes, where his mission is to communicate the excitement of real psychological science to the public.

=== Books ===
Feldman has co-authored four books.

- Feldman, D. B., & Lasher, S. A., Jr. (2008). The end-of-life handbook: A compassionate guide to connecting with and caring for a dying loved one. Oakland, CA: New Harbinger Publications.
- Feldman, D. B., & Silvia, P. J. (2010). Public speaking for psychologists: A lighthearted guide to research presentations, job talks, and other opportunities to embarrass yourself. Washington, DC: American Psychological Association.
- Feldman, D. B., & Kravetz, L. D. (2014). Supersurvivors: The surprising link between suffering and success. New York: HarperCollins.
- Cheavens, J. S., & Feldman, D. B. (2022). The science and application of positive psychology. New York: Cambridge University Press.

== Professional memberships ==
- Association for Behavioral and Cognitive Therapies
- American Psychological Association
- Society for Behavioral Medicine
