= David Feldman (musician) =

Brazilian-Israeli musical artist

David Feldman דוד פלדמן
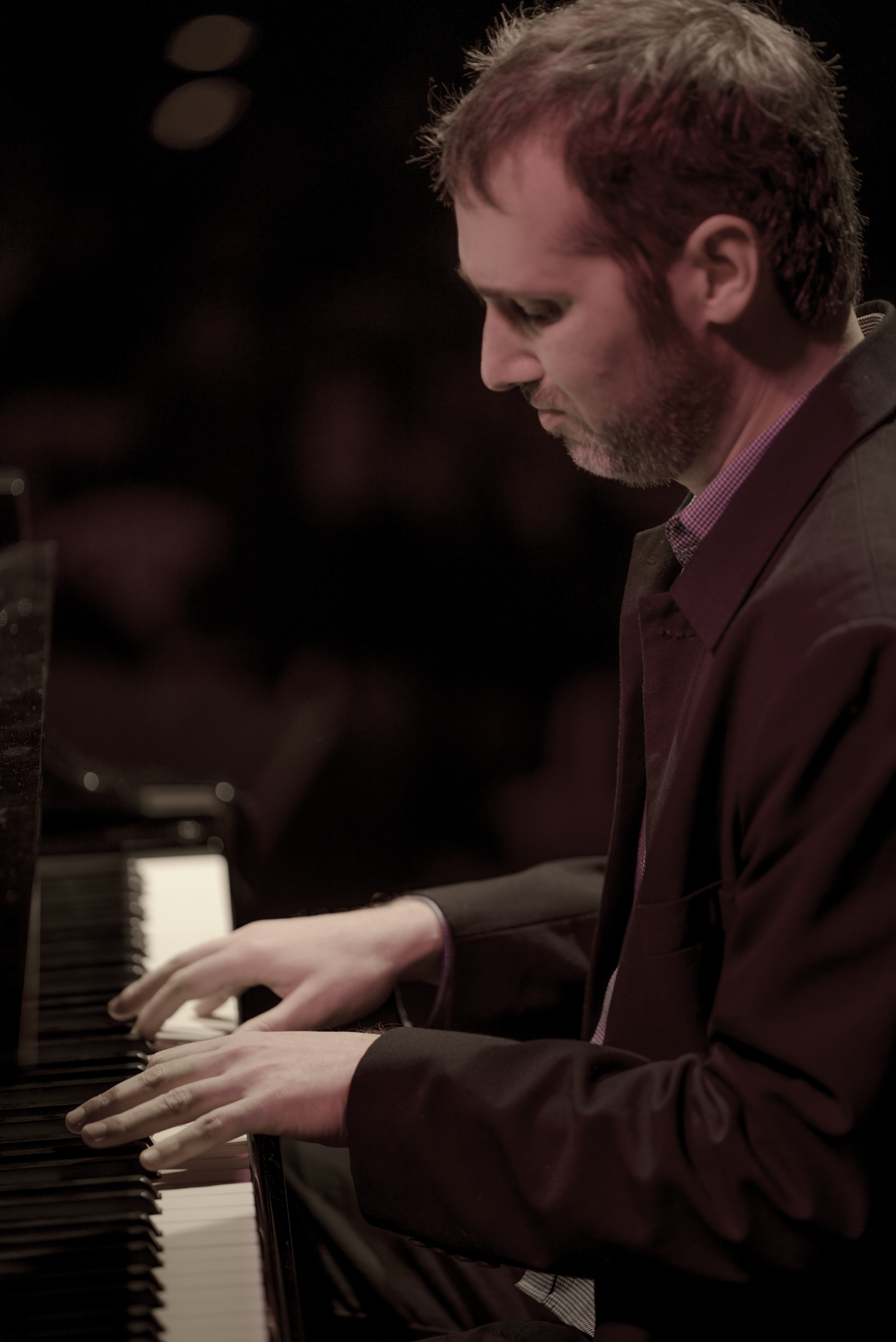

Background information
- Born: 29 December 1977 (age 48); Rio de Janeiro, Brazil
- Genres: Jazz, Bossa Nova
- Occupations: Musician, arranger, producer, composer, sound engineer
- Instruments: Piano, Electronic keyboard
- Years active: 1998-present
- Website: www.davidfeldmanmusic.com

David Feldman (Hebrew: דוד פלדמן; born 29 December 1977, in Rio de Janeiro) is a Brazilian-Israeli Jazz and Bossa Nova pianist, arranger, producer, composer, and sound engineer.

== Early life ==
David Feldman was born into a family of classical and early-music musicians. He studied with Ileana Carneiro, Sheila Zagury, and Luiz Eça.

== New York ==
In 2000, Feldman enrolled at The New School for Jazz and Contemporary Music in New York, graduating in 2002. He worked with Slide Hampton and Claudio Roditi, was invited to sit in at the Mingus Big Band, and worked with Duduka da Fonseca and Anat Cohen at Duduka's NY Samba Jazz Group, Matt Garrison and Eli Degibri.

== Back to Rio ==
In 2004, he was a semi-finalist in the Solo Piano Competition at the Montreux Jazz Festival. In Brazil, he plays with Leny Andrade, Leila Pinheiro, and also has played in duos with veterans Paulo Moura and Leo Gandelman. Feldman collaborates with the Brazilian NY-based drummer Duduka da Fonseca, is the pianist in Duduka's trio with excellent critic reviews, and incorporates Duduka as the drummer of the David Feldman Trio in New York.

Feldman released his first album "O Som do Beco Das Garrafas" in 2009, which was very well received by the critics. Since then, he has performed in jazz festivals in Brazil and overseas, having performed more than four times at the Festival Internacional de Jazz de Punta del Este, where in 2014 he had clarinetist/saxophonist Paquito D’Rivera as special guest. A video of that show can be seen here, in which David and Paquito played David's original tune "Esqueçeram de mim no aeroporto" with André Vasconcellos on bass, Márcio Bahia on drums, Frank Basile on Baritone sax, and Diego Urcola on trumpet.

Feldman's solo disc "Piano" from 2014 was also received well by the critics.

In September 2016, Feldman released the Horizonte album with seven original songs. Mauro Ferreira states that "Horizonte confirms the carioca pianist as one of the great talents of today's Brazilian instrumental music". According to Dan Bilawsky, who gave Horizonte 4.5 stars out of 5, in his review on All About Jazz, "While Feldman's decision to remain in Rio de Janeiro has kept him slightly off the radar, this album is a brilliant blip that should register with Brazilian jazz lovers near and far. Feldman's composing chops take center stage, his piano playing—alternately ruminative and animated—delights, and his crafting of a strong group dynamic speaks volumes about his leadership."

In April 2018, Feldman's participation in Duduka Da Fonseca's "Plays Dom Salvador," which received a 4-star rating from DownBeat's June 2018 edition, does an "admirable job of fleshing out the harmony in Salvador’s writing without underplaying the rhythmic content, and his phrasing on "Mariá" and "Para Elis" leaves one wondering why those ballads aren't better known," according to J.D. Cosidine.

In December 2019, Feldman hosted a Jam Session at the Art Boutiki, his first connection with the US West Coast Jazz scene.

== Discography ==
=== As band leader or soloist ===
- 2009: O Som do Beco Das Garrafas
- 2014: Piano
- 2016: Horizonte featuring Toninho Horta and Raul de Souza
- 2018: Horizonte Horizonte (Ao Vivo no Blue Note Rio)

=== With Joca Perpignan ===
- 2008: Entreventos Piano, production and arrangements

=== With Duduka da Fonseca Trio ===
- 2011: Plays Toninho Horta Piano
- 2013: New Samba Jazz Directions Piano
- 2015: Jive Samba Piano
- 2018: Plays Dom Salvador Piano

=== With Paulo Levi ===
- 2013: Between 2 Thoughts Piano

=== With Paula Morelenbaum ===
- 2008: Telecoteco Piano

=== With Scott Feiner ===
- 2008: Dois Mundos Piano, Production, Latin Grammy Awards of 2009 Nominee

=== With Achinoam Nini ===
- 2015: Love Medicine Piano

=== With Adam Dunning ===
- 2012: Glass Bottom Boat Piano

=== With Yotam Silberstein ===
- 2011: Brasil Piano

=== With Ensemble PHOENIX ===
- 2003: Wind and Sea Arrangements
