= List of Michael Bloomberg 2020 presidential campaign endorsements =

- Campaign: 2020 United States presidential election (Democratic primaries)
- Candidate: Michael Bloomberg; Mayor of New York City (2002–2013)
- Affiliation: Democratic Party
- Announced: November 24, 2019
- Headquarters: 229 West 43rd Street (8th floor in the old New York Times Building on New York City's Times Square)
- Key people: Kevin Sheekey – campaign manager Kelly Mehlenbacher – deputy COO; Advisors: Howard Wolfson; Jason Schecter
- Slogan(s): Rebuild America; Fighting for our future A new choice for Democrats; Mike Will Get It Done; I Like Mike

Website
- www.mikebloomberg.com

This is a list of notable individuals and organizations who voiced their endorsement of Michael Bloomberg's campaign for the Democratic Party's nomination for the 2020 U.S. presidential election.

== Federal officials ==
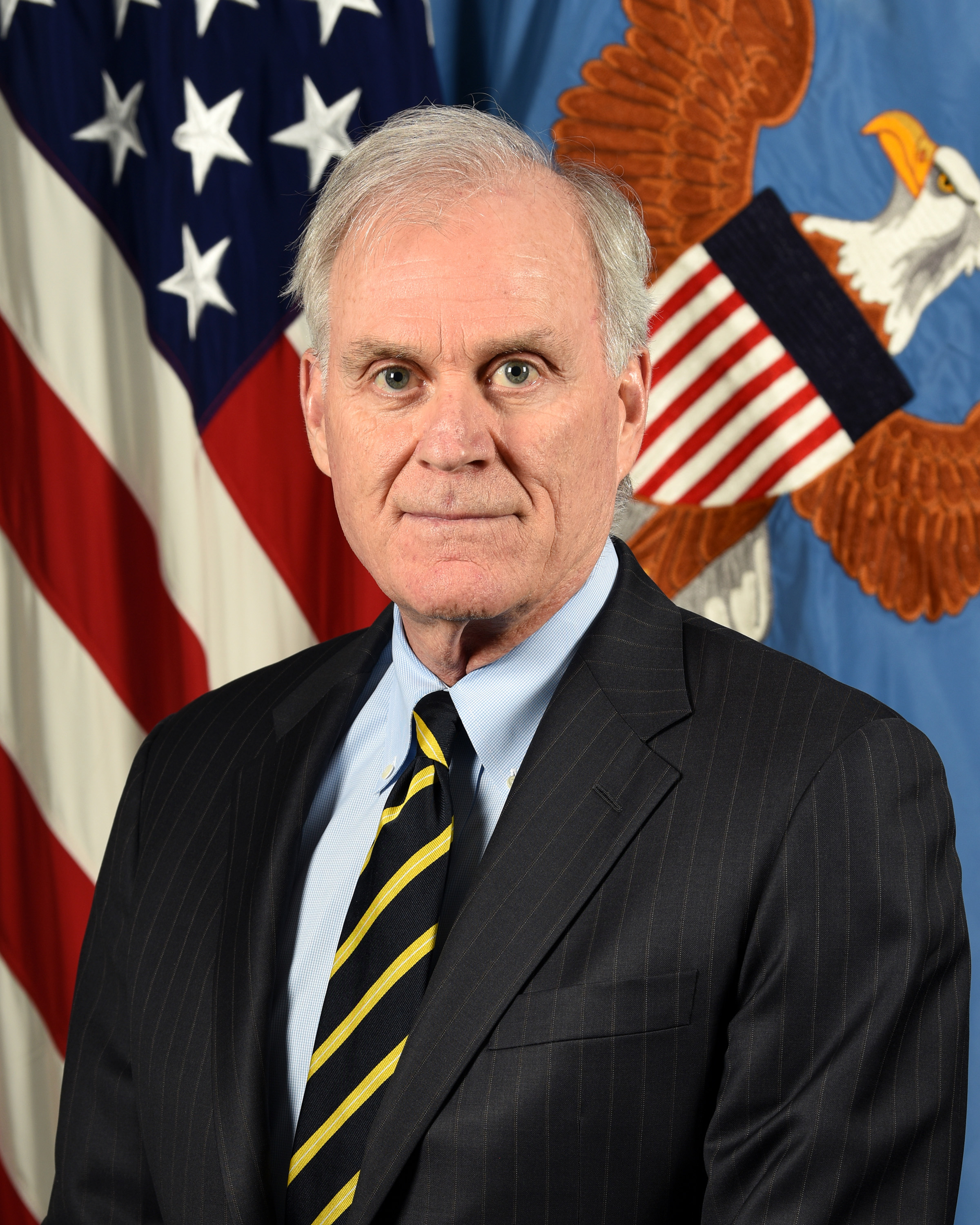
Richard V. Spencer

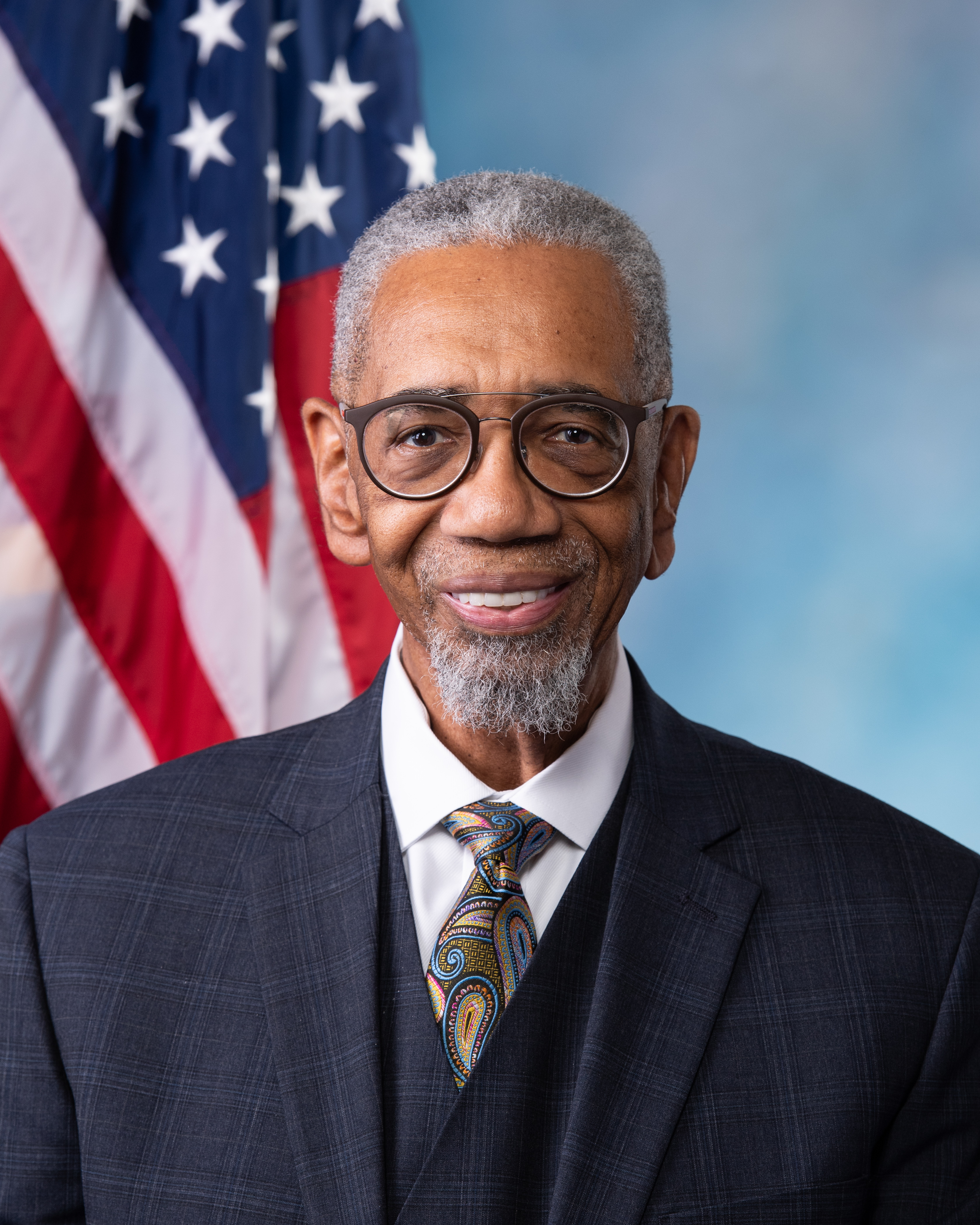
Bobby Rush

=== White House officials ===
==== Former ====
- Richard V. Spencer, former Secretary of the Navy (2017–2019) (Republican)

=== U.S. representatives ===
==== Current ====
- Ted Deutch, U.S. representative from FL-19 (2010–2013), FL-21 (2013–2017), and FL-22 since 2017
- Josh Gottheimer, U.S. representative from NJ-5 since 2017 (previously endorsed Cory Booker)
- Nita Lowey, U.S. representative from NY-17 since 1989
- Ben McAdams, U.S. representative from UT-04 since 2019
- Lucy McBath, U.S. representative from GA-06 since 2019
- Gregory Meeks, U.S. representative from NY-5 since 1998
- Stephanie Murphy, U.S. representative from FL-07 since 2017 (previously endorsed Beto O'Rourke)
- Scott Peters, U.S. representative from CA-52 since 2013
- Stacey Plaskett, delegate U.S. representative from VI-at large since 2015 (previously endorsed Kamala Harris)
- Max Rose, U.S. representative from NY-11 since 2019
- Harley Rouda, U.S. representative from CA-48 since 2019
- Bobby Rush, U.S. representative from IL-01 since 1993 (previously endorsed Kamala Harris)
- Mikie Sherrill, U.S. representative from NJ-11 since 2019 (previously endorsed Cory Booker)
- Haley Stevens, U.S. representative from MI-11 since 2019
- Juan Vargas, U.S. representative from CA-51 since 2013 (previously endorsed John Delaney)

==== Former ====
- Tom Allen, former U.S. representative from ME-01 (1997–2009)
- Harold Ford, Sr., former U.S. representative from TN-09 (1975–1997)
- Gloria Negrete McLeod, former U.S. representative from CA-35 (2013–2015)
- Mike Michaud, former U.S. representative from ME-02 (2003–2015)
- Mark Schauer, former U.S. representative from MI-07 (2009–2011)

== State officials ==
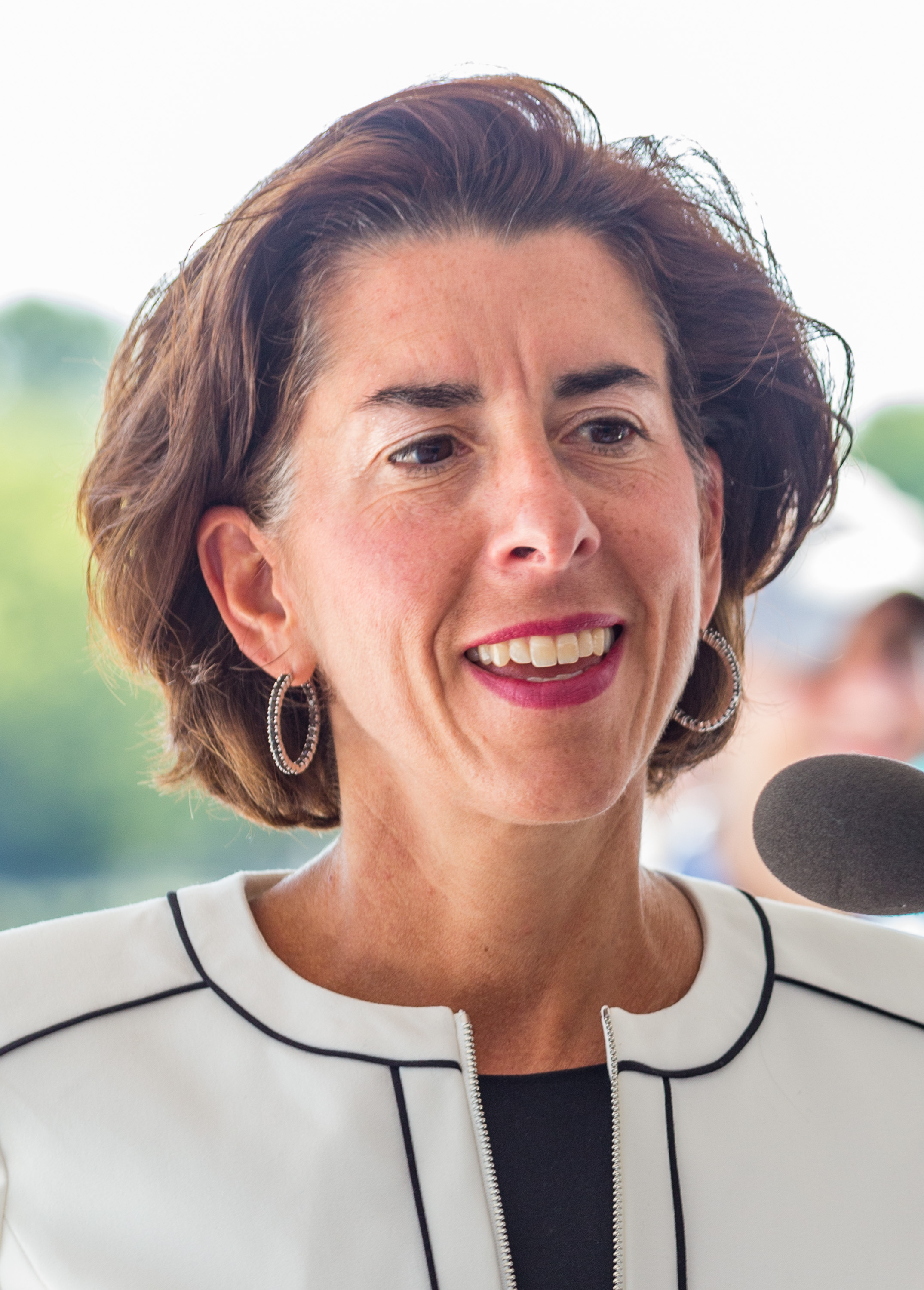
Gina Raimondo

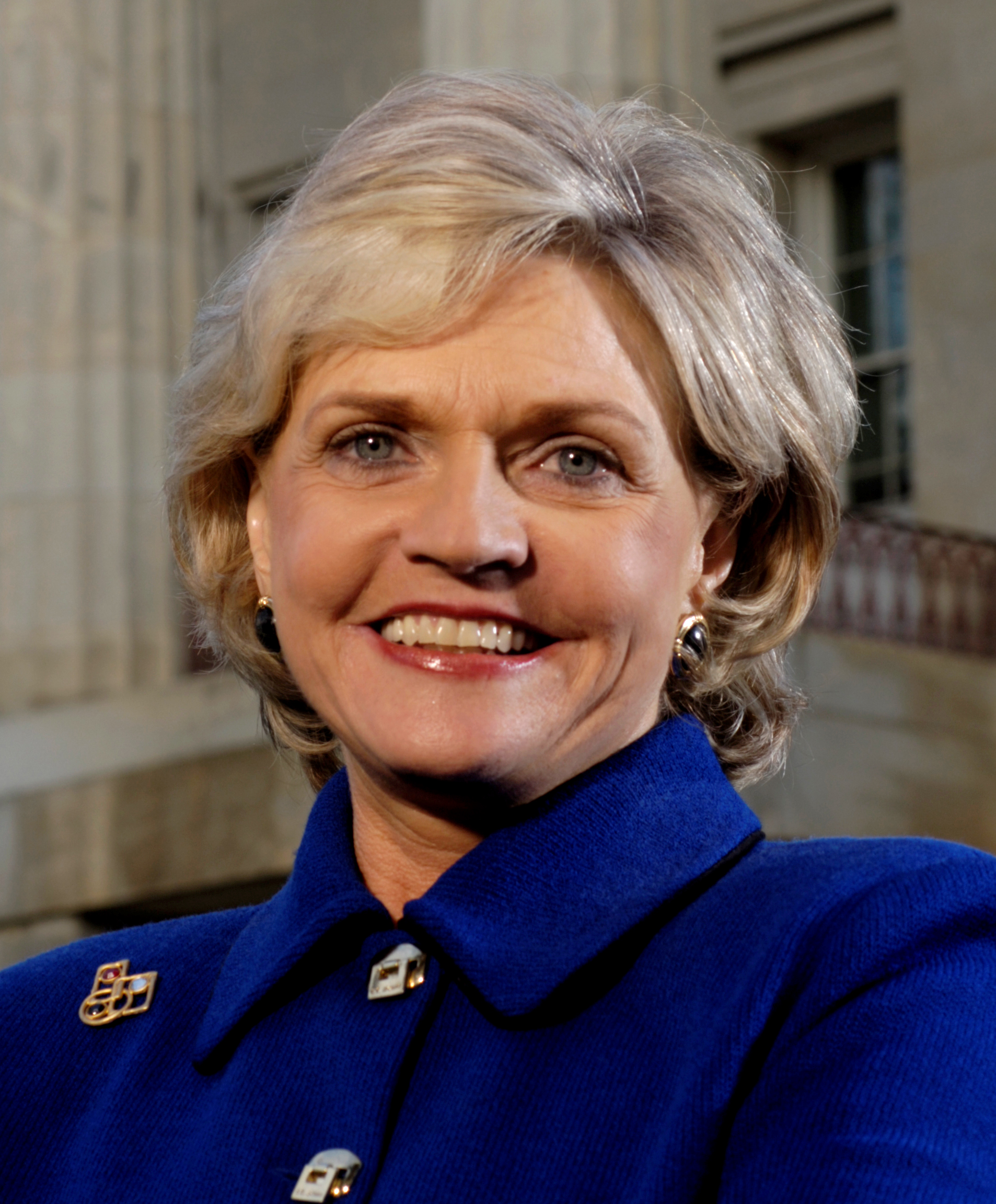
Bev Perdue

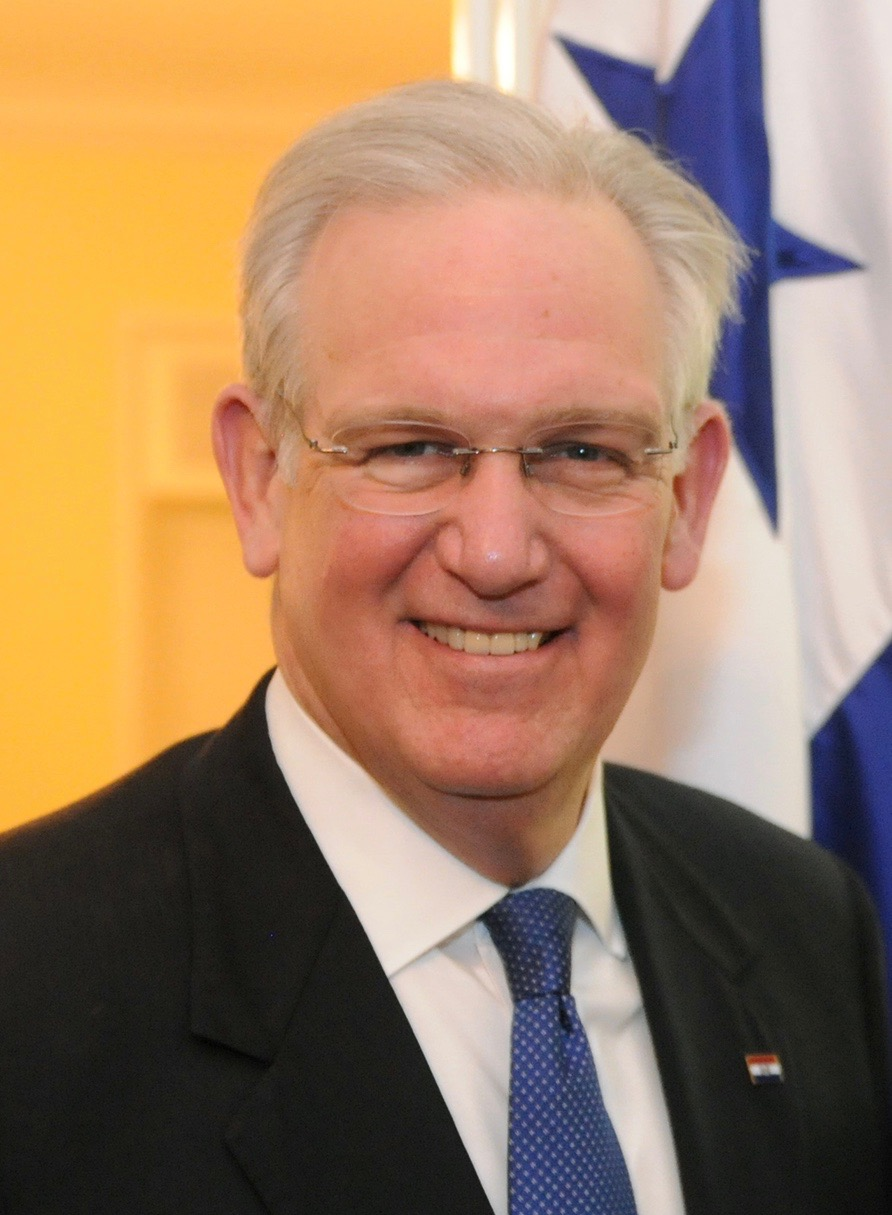
Jay Nixon

=== Governors ===
==== Current ====
- Gina Raimondo, governor of Rhode Island (2015–2021)

==== Former ====
- Carlos Romero Barceló, governor of Puerto Rico (1977–1985)
- Brad Henry, governor of Oklahoma (2003–2011)
- Jay Nixon, governor of Missouri (2009–2017)
- Bev Perdue, governor of North Carolina (2009–2013)

=== State executive officials ===
==== Former ====
- Alex Sink, former chief financial officer of Florida (2007–2011), and 2010 Democratic nominee for governor of Florida and 2014 nominee for U.S. representative

=== State legislators ===
==== Current ====
- Cesar Chavez, state representative, Arizona State Legislature, District 29
- Michael Cusick, New York State Assembly since 2012
- Taylor Darling, New York state assemblywoman from District 18 since 2019
- Todd Kaminsky, New York senator from District 9 since 2016
- Jennifer Longdon, state representative, Arizona State Legislature, District 24
- Kionne McGhee, minority leader of the Florida House of Representatives since 2019 and Florida state representative from District 117 since 2012
- Richard Roth, California senator from District 31 since 2012 (previously endorsed Kamala Harris)
- Diane Savino, New York senator from District 23 since 2004
- Bobby Singleton, minority leader of the Alabama State Senate since 2019 and Alabama state senator from District 24 since 2005; former Alabama state representative from District 72 (2002–2005)
- Tom Sullivan, Colorado state representative from District 37 since 2019
- Clyde Vanel, New York state assemblyman from District 33 since 2016

==== Former ====
- Ian Conyers, former Michigan state senator from District 4 (2016–2018)

== Local and municipal officials ==
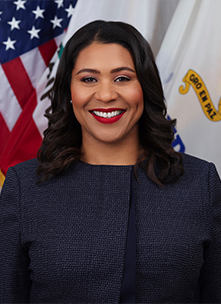
London Breed

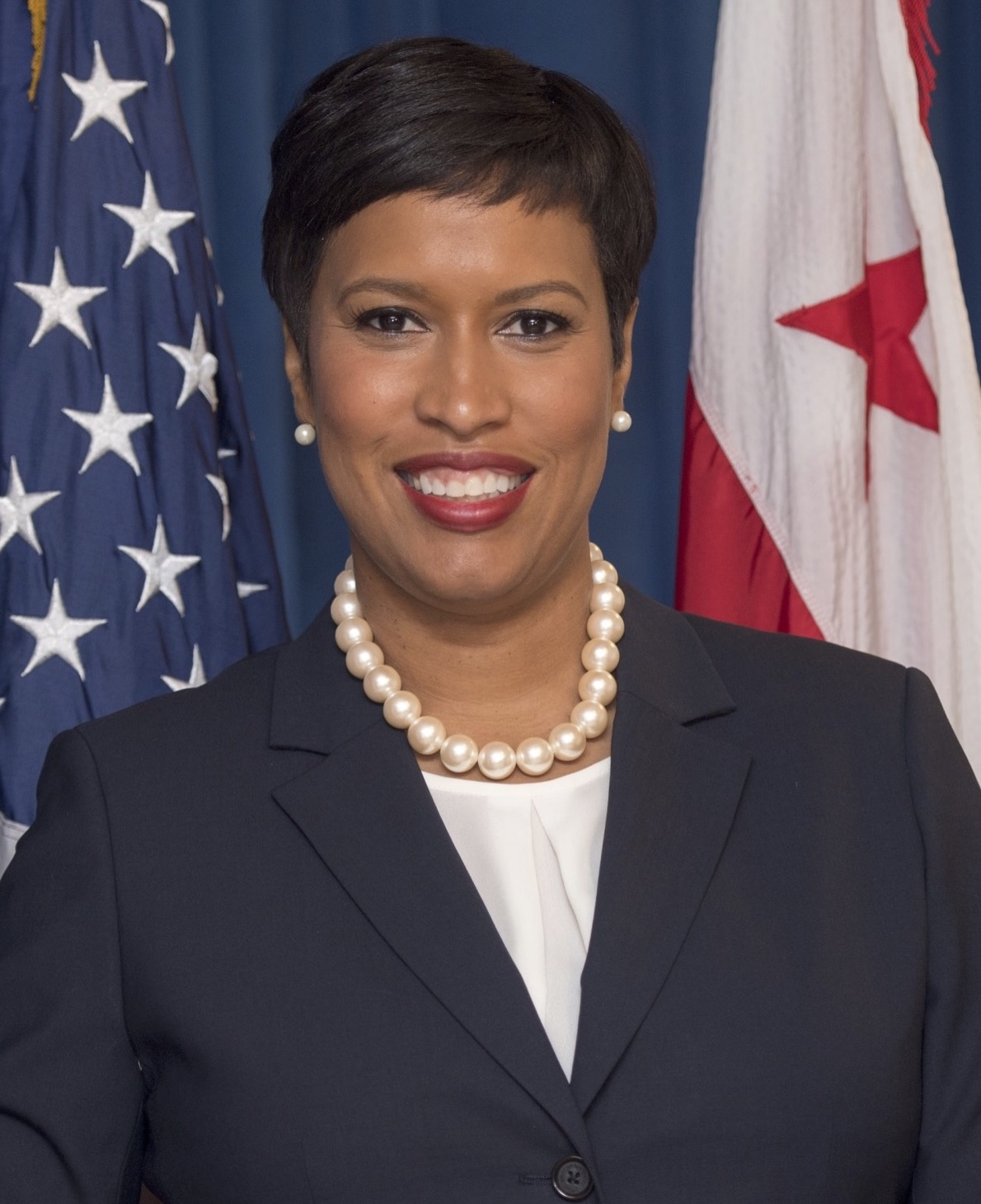
Muriel Bowser

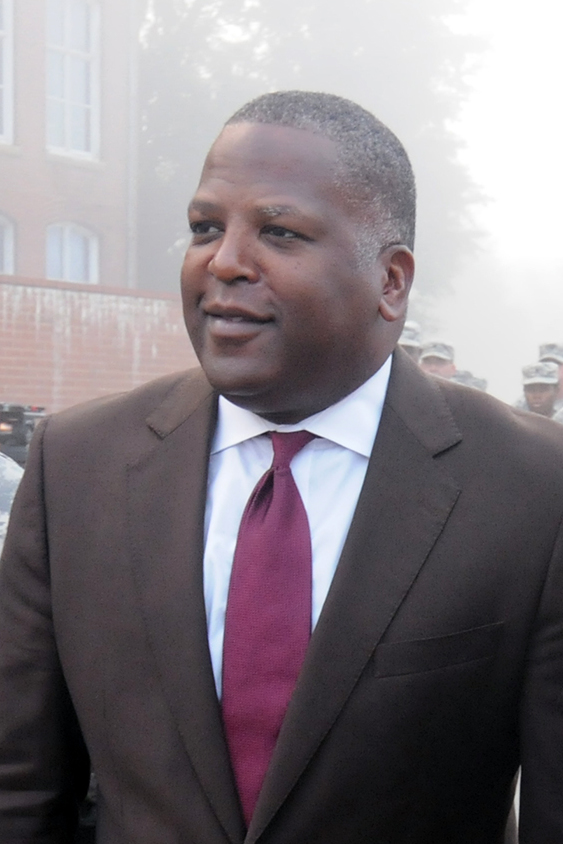
Stephen K. Benjamin

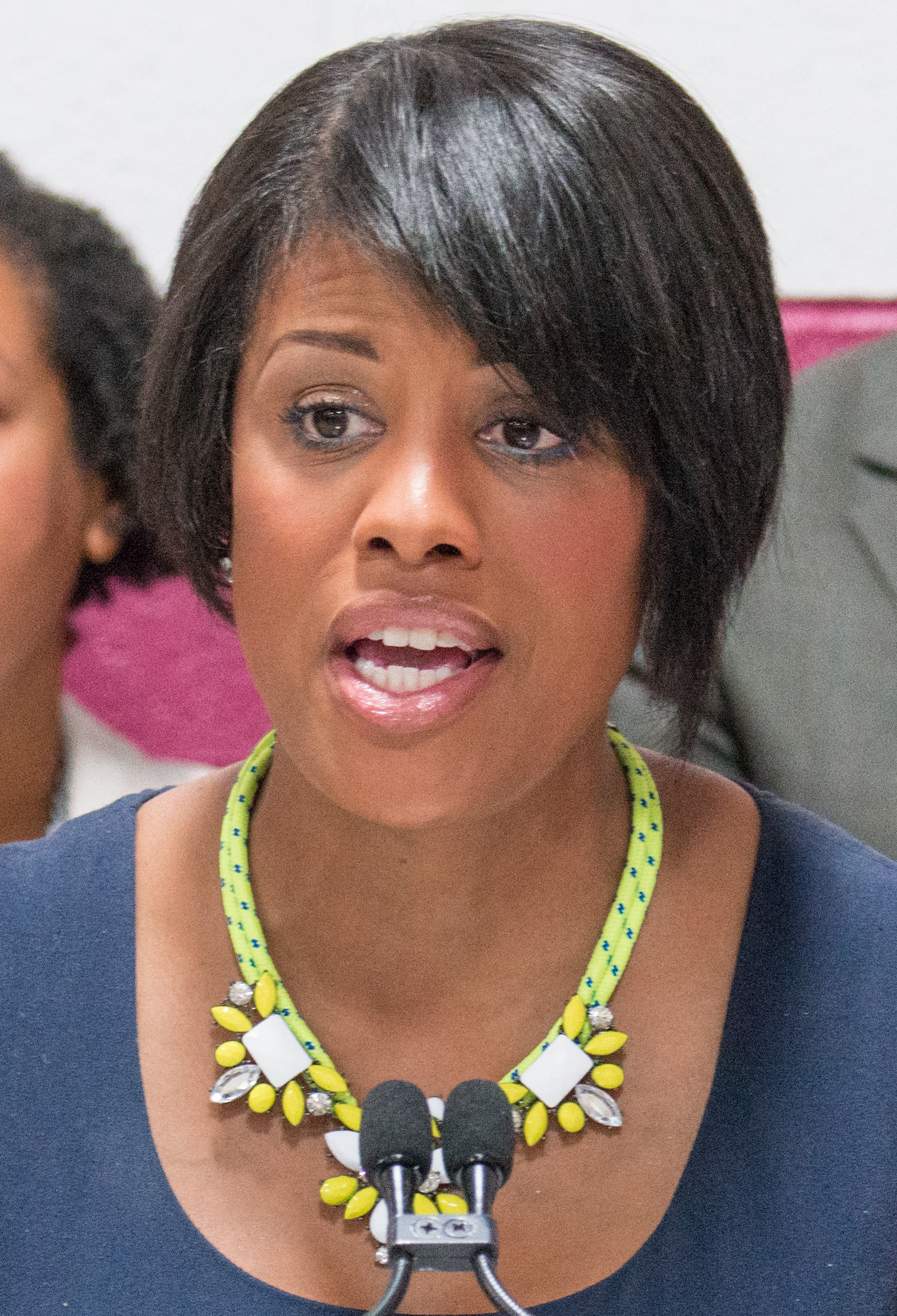
Stephanie Rawlings-Blake

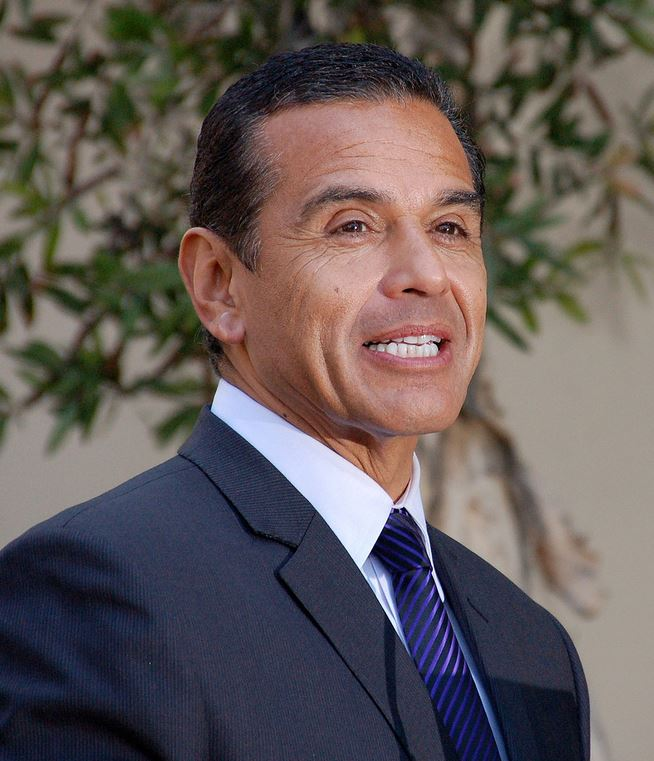
Antonio Villaraigosa

=== Mayors ===
==== Current ====
- Mary-Ann Baldwin, mayor of Raleigh, North Carolina, since 2019
- Stephen K. Benjamin, mayor of Columbia, South Carolina, since 2010
- Ethan Berkowitz, mayor of Anchorage, Alaska, since 2015
- Muriel Bowser, mayor of Washington, D. C., since 2015
- London Breed, mayor of San Francisco, California, since 2018; former acting mayor (2017–2018) (previously endorsed Kamala Harris)
- Aja Brown, mayor of Compton, California, since 2013 (previously endorsed Kamala Harris)
- Serge Dedina, mayor of Imperial Beach, California, since 2014
- Greg Fischer, mayor of Louisville, Kentucky, since 2011
- Dan Horrigan, mayor of Akron, Ohio, since 2016 (previously endorsed Tim Ryan)
- Keith James, mayor of West Palm Beach, Florida, since 2019
- Brian Kulpa, supervisor of Amherst, New York
- Sam Liccardo, mayor of San Jose, California, since 2014 (previously endorsed Kamala Harris)
- Vi Lyles, mayor of Charlotte, North Carolina, since 2017
- Ken Miyagishima, mayor of Las Cruces, New Mexico, since 2007
- Adrian Perkins, mayor of Shreveport, Louisiana, since 2018
- Bill Saffo, mayor of Wilmington, North Carolina, since 2007
- Mary Salas, mayor of Chula Vista, California, since 2014
- Frank Scott, Jr., mayor of Little Rock, Arkansas, since 2019 (previously endorsed Kamala Harris)
- Kathy Sheehan, mayor of Albany, New York, since 2014
- Mike Spano, mayor of Yonkers, New York, since 2012
- Jim Strickland, mayor of Memphis, Tennessee, since 2016
- Michael Tubbs, mayor of Stockton, California, since 2016.
- Sylvester Turner, mayor of Houston, Texas, since 2016
- Lovely Warren, mayor of Rochester, New York, since 2014
- Alan Webber, mayor of Santa Fe, New Mexico, since 2018
- Victoria Woodards, mayor of Tacoma, Washington, since 2018

==== Former ====
- Virg Bernero, mayor of Lansing, Michigan, former Democratic Party nominee for governor of Michigan
- Bob Buckhorn, mayor of Tampa, Florida (2011–2019)
- Michael B. Coleman, mayor of Columbus, Ohio (2000–2016) (previously endorsed Kamala Harris)
- Karl Dean, mayor of Nashville, Tennessee (2007–2015) and 2018 Democratic nominee for governor of Tennessee
- Manny Diaz, mayor of Miami (2001–2009) (previously endorsed Joe Biden)
- David Dinkins, mayor of New York City (1990–1993)
- Bill Finch, mayor of Bridgeport, Connecticut (2007–2015)
- Nancy McFarlane, mayor of Raleigh, North Carolina (2011–2019)
- Charles Meeker, mayor of Raleigh, North Carolina (2001–2011)
- Michael Nutter, mayor of Philadelphia (2008–2016) (previously endorsed Joe Biden) (Note: initially endorsed Bloomberg; after Bloomberg announced he would not run in March 2019, Nutter endorsed Biden; Nutter switched his endorsement to Bloomberg on December 20, 2019, less than one month into Bloomberg's bid))
- Stephanie Rawlings-Blake, mayor of Baltimore, Maryland (2010–2016)
- Antonio Villaraigosa, speaker of the California Assembly (1998–2000), majority leader of the California Assembly (1996–1998), California Assemblyman from District 45 (1994–2000); mayor of Los Angeles (2005–2013)
- Karen Weaver, mayor of Flint, Michigan (2015–2019)
- Andrew Young, former mayor of Atlanta, Georgia (1982–1990), United States ambassador to the United Nations (1977–1979), U.S. representative from GA-05 (1973–1977)

=== Municipal executive officials ===
==== Current ====
- Steve Bellone, Suffolk County executive since 2012
- Warren Evans, Wayne County executive since 2015
- Joel Feroleto, member of the Buffalo Common Council from the Delaware district
- Mike Thurmond, chief executive officer of DeKalb County since 2017
- Paul Vallone, member of New York City Council since 2014

==== Former ====
- C. Virginia Fields, former borough president of Manhattan (1998–2005)
- Claire Shulman, former borough president of Queens (1986–1994)
- Diana Taylor, former New York Superintendent of Banks (2003–2007); Bloomberg's partner

== Party officials ==
=== DNC members ===
==== Current ====
- Khary Penebaker, DNC member and businessman (previously endorsed Cory Booker)

=== Organizations ===
- Alabama Democratic Conference

== Notable individuals ==
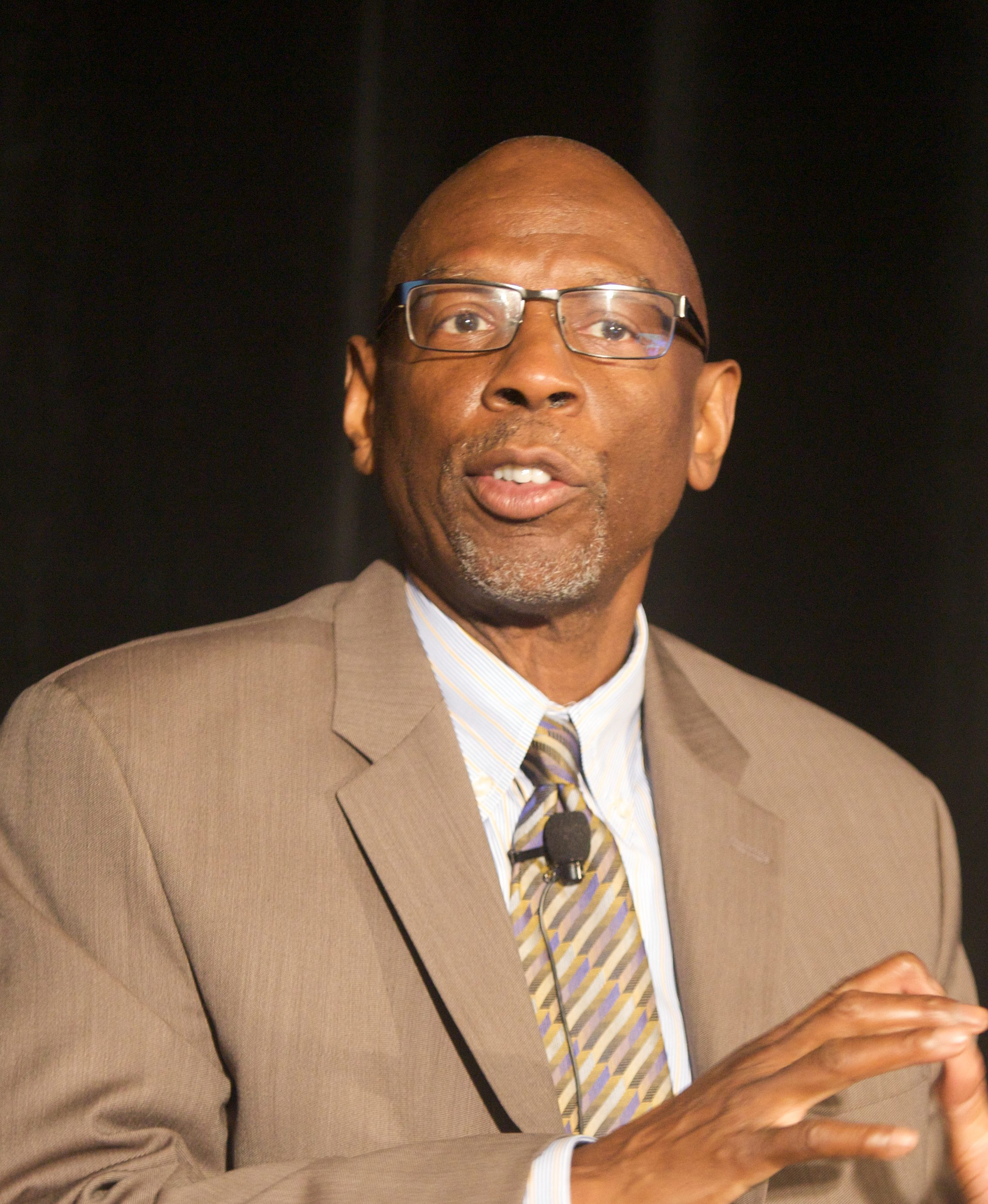
Geoffrey Canada

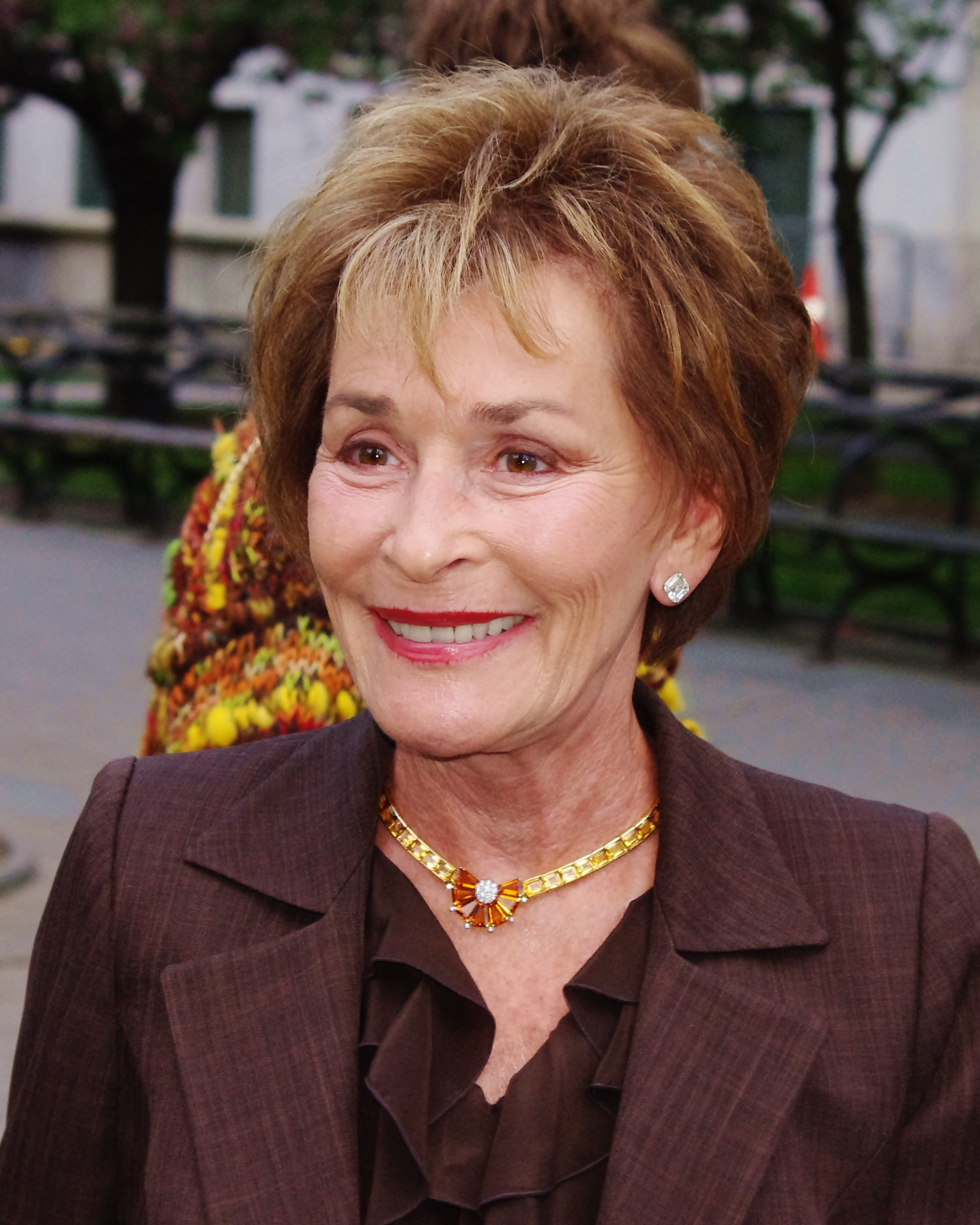
Judy Sheindlin

=== Athletes and sports figures ===
- Tim Duncan, former NBA player for the San Antonio Spurs
- Dhani Jones, former NFL player, television host
- Gail Marquis, former basketball player who competed in the 1976 Summer Olympics
- Dara Torres, professional swimmer and Olympic champion

=== Authors, activists, and journalists ===
- Geoffrey Canada, educator, social activist, author, and president of the Harlem Children's Zone in Harlem, New York, since 1990
- Sam Donaldson, former ABC News White House Correspondent and co-anchor of This Week
- Thomas Friedman, New York Times columnist, author

=== Business leaders ===
- Barbara Corcoran, businesswoman, consultant and television personality, co-host of Shark Tank
- Patricia Harris, CEO of Bloomberg Philanthropies and Bloomberg 2020 campaign chair
- Jane Rosenthal, film producer
- Kevin Sheekey, businessman and political advisor; Bloomberg 2020 campaign manager
- Paula Stone Williams, pastoral counselor and former president of the Christian church planting group Orchard Group (1989–2009)

=== Entertainers and artists ===
- Lorraine Bracco, actress
- Ted Danson, actor and producer
- Michael Douglas, actor
- Clint Eastwood, actor, film director, and former mayor of Carmel-by-the-Sea, California (1986–1988) (Libertarian)
- Tim Gunn, fashion consultant, television personality, actor, voice actor, and author
- John Mellencamp, musician and singer-songwriter
- Bette Midler, actress
- Isaac Mizrahi, fashion designer, TV presenter, and chief designer of the Isaac Mizrahi brand for Xcel Brands
- Judy Sheindlin, star of Judge Judy, author, television personality, former Manhattan family court judge, civil court judge, and prosecutor
- Sela Ward, actress
- Sam Waterston, actor

== Newspapers ==
Boston Herald

- Boston Herald, Boston, Massachusetts
- The Charlotte Post, Charlotte, North Carolina
- The Lowell Sun, Lowell, Massachusetts (previously endorsed Andrew Yang)
- Sentinel & Enterprise, Fitchburg, Massachusetts (previously endorsed Andrew Yang)
- TimesDaily, Florence, Alabama
