= FGS Global =

Public relations company based in London and New York

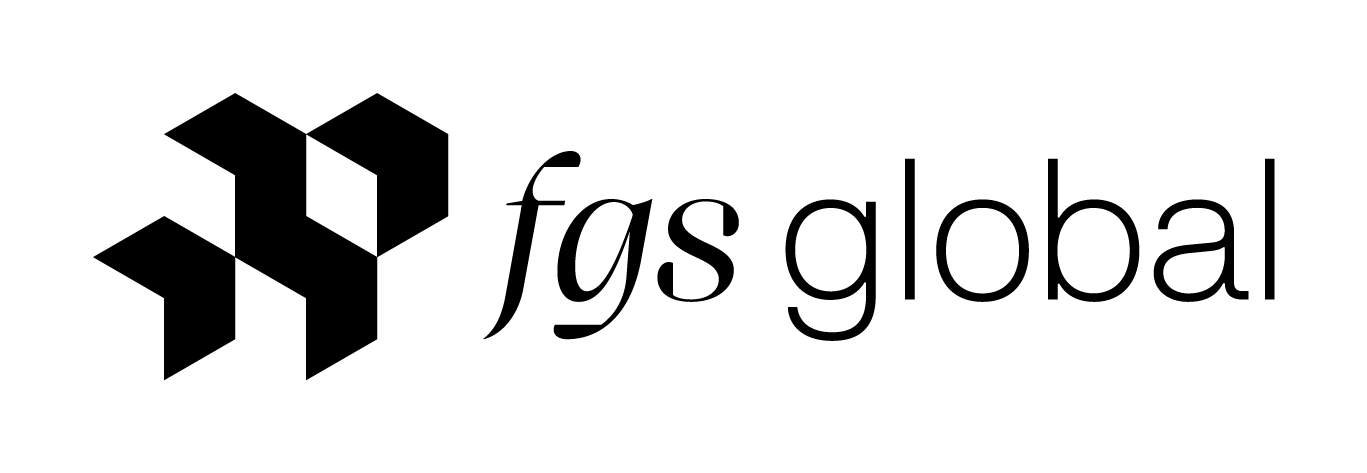
- Industry: Consultancy
- Predecessors: Finsbury, Hering Schuppener, The Glover Park Group, Sard Verbinnen & Co
- Founded: 1994; 32 years ago
- Headquarters: New York
- Area served: Global
- Key people: Alexander Geiser (CEO)
- Parent: KKR (80%)
- Website: fgsglobal.com

FGS Global is a strategic advisory and communications consultancy headquartered in New York City. The firm was formed in 2021 through the merger of Finsbury Glover Hering and Sard Verbinnen & Co. It is a portfolio company of KKR.

FGS Global provides services including corporate reputation management, financial communications, public affairs, crisis management, and transaction advisory.

== History ==
Finsbury was founded by Roland Rudd in 1994. In 2001, the firm was sold to WPP in a deal that the Financial Times estimated earned Rudd £40 million. Rudd remained chairman of the company.

=== RLM Finsbury ===
In 2011, Finsbury merged with Robinson Lerer & Montgomery of New York to form RLM Finsbury. Rudd continued as chairman and Walter G. Montgomery became chief executive officer of the enlarged firm. Montgomery retired as chief executive officer in 2014, but remained a partner in the firm. Montgomery was replaced by Michael Gross until 2017 when he transitioned to Vice-Chair and Paul Homes was announced as CEO.

==== 2012 Wikipedia editing ====
In 2012, The Times reported that Alisher Usmanov, a Russian billionaire who was about to launch one of the largest stock market listings in London for his MegaFon mobile phone company, hired RLM Finsbury which "covertly cleaned up his online image and removed details of his past" before the offering. The Telegraph reported that RLM Finsbury staff anonymously "deleted details of a Soviet-era criminal conviction and freedom of speech row" and then "replaced those sections with text outlining Mr Usmanov's philanthropy and art collection." According to O'Dwyer's PR, the firm publicly apologised in The Times, giving the following statement: "This was not done in the proper manner nor was this approach authorized by Mr. Usmanov. We apologize for this and it will not happen again."

=== Finsbury rebrand ===
In 2014, RLM Finsbury rebranded as Finsbury to underline its global ambitions. In 2020, Finsbury developed "Finsbury's Workforce Return", a service that guided businesses in managing employees returning to the workplace after the COVID-19 pandemic lockdowns.

=== Finsbury Glover Hering ===
In January 2021, Finsbury, The Glover Park Group (GPG), and Hering Schuppener completed a merger and management buy-in of 49.99%, forming Finsbury Glover Hering. At that stage, the company had 18 offices and almost 700 consultants worldwide. WPP remained a 50.01% investor. Following the merger, Rudd and Carter Eskew, founder of GPG, served as co-chairs, while Alexander Geiser, managing partner at Hering Schuppener, became CEO. As of October 2021, the business was worth $917 million.

=== FGS Global ===
In December 2021, Finsbury Glover Hering and Sard Verbinnen & Co. merged and rebranded as FGS Global, with Geiser appointed as CEO. The agency then had 25 offices in North America, Europe, Asia and the Middle East, and over 1,000 employees. In October 2022, FGS Global opened its eighth office in Europe. Also in 2022, the firm ranked number one in terms of the volume and the value of mergers and acquisitions deals. In January 2023, FGS Global led communication consulting in operations in Spain.

In April 2023, US private equity investor KKR was reported to be in talks to buy a stake in FGS Global. On April 11, it was confirmed that KKR had agreed to buy a 30 per cent stake in FGS that valued the company at about $1.4 billion. As part of the deal, existing investor Golden State Capital will sell its entire stake to KKR.

In December 2024, it was announced that KKR had acquired a majority stake in FGS Global from WPP for $767 million.

In January 2026, it was announced that FGS Global had acquired Memetica, a specialist consultancy focused on AI-driven digital threat detection and intelligence. The acquisition accompanied the launch of FGS Global’s AI Advisory practice and resulted in Memetica’s integration into the firm’s AI and Innovation group.

== Notable clients ==
In May 2025, FGS Global advised DICK's Sporting Goods on its $2.5 billion acquisition of Foot Locker.

== Shareholders ==
As of August 2024, Kite Bidco Inc owns the majority stake of FGS Global. Golden Gate Capital owned 40 per cent of Sard Verbinnen & Co., and holds a small stake in FGS Global following the merger. About 40 per cent of the company's employees are shareholders, of which 25.9% were FGH employees.

== Predecessors ==
The Glover Park Group was founded in June 2001 by former White House and Democratic campaign officials Michael Feldman, Carter Eskew, Joe Lockhart and Chip Smith. Based in Washington, D.C., the consultancy assisted companies with their legislative goals using television advertising and public relations. In November 2011, Glover Park was acquired by WPP. At the time, the firm had $60 million in annual revenue.

Sard Verbinnen & Co. was founded in 1992 by George Sard and Paul Verbinnen. The firm managed deals, investor relations, and crises. As of 2021, the company had more than 200 employees.

Hering Schuppener was founded in 1995 by Ralf Hering and Bernd Schuppener and headquartered in Düsseldorf, Germany. The firm assisted with capital market communication including acquisitions, mergers, and restructuring, and advised clients on crisis public relations, reputation issues, and political communication.
