= Chip Smith =

American businessman and political strategist

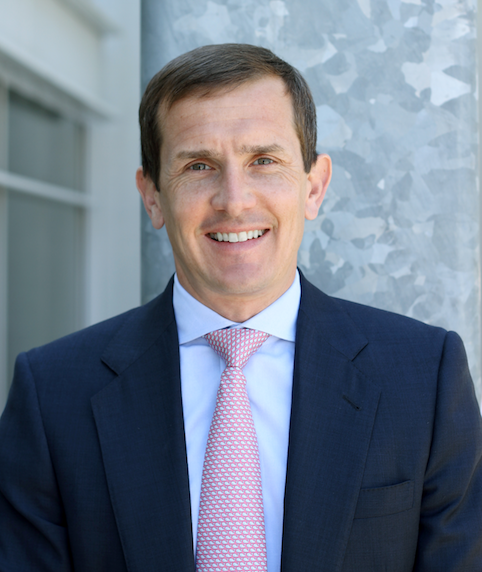
- Chip Smith
- Born: Atlanta, GA
- Known for: Co-founder of The Glover Park Group, Chief of staff for Al Gore's 2000 Presidential Campaign

Chip Smith is an American businessman, corporate adviser and political strategist. He was the Executive Vice President of Public Affairs at 21st Century Fox until its acquisition by The Walt Disney Company in 2019. A long-time political adviser, Smith served as chief of staff and deputy campaign manager for Al Gore's 2000 presidential campaign and then in 2001 co-founded The Glover Park Group where he was the CEO until 2016. He became the Executive Vice President of Public Affairs for 21st Century Fox in July 2016. He has been featured as an expert by publications, television networks, and broadcast programs including Anderson Cooper 360°, Fox News, and MSNBC.

== Education ==
Smith attended the Lawrenceville School and graduated in 1986. Smith graduated from Colby College in 1991 with a bachelor's degree in American Studies. He earned an MBA from the McDonough School of Business at Georgetown University in Washington D.C.

== Early career ==
Soon after graduating from Colby, Smith oversaw the advance team for Senator Bob Kerrey during his campaign for the Democratic presidential nomination in 1992. Smith coordinated more than 1,000 student workers for the campaign. He then worked for Senator Wyche Fowler as a legislative assistant.

In 1995, he joined Robert Shrum and Tad Devine as they started media consulting firm Shrum, Devine & Donilon. Smith’s kitchen served as the firm’s first office. Smith became an executive vice president for the firm, a role in which he created and produced advertising for political campaigns.

Smith left political work in 1996 to become chief of staff to the president and chief executive officer of MCI Inc. He led internal and external communications for the company until his departure in 2000.

Smith then joined Al Gore’s 2000 presidential campaign as chief of staff and deputy campaign manager. He managed all day-to-day operations out of the campaign’s Nashville headquarters. Alongside Donna Brazile, Smith also headed the "war room," Gore's committee for operations, communications, and outreach during the Florida election recount.

== The Glover Park Group ==
Smith founded The Glover Park Group in 2001 with Joe Lockhart and former Gore campaign colleagues Carter Eskew and Michael Feldman. The firm began its operations in the Glover Park neighborhood of Washington D.C., and specializes in political communications, public relations, and advertising. Smith has served as the managing director and COO of the firm. He was the agency's CEO from early 2007 until 2016.

In 2006, Smith was involved in securing an investment in The Glover Park Group from private equity firm Svoboda, Collins Fund in order to expand business operations. The Glover Park Group was acquired by WPP plc in 2011, but Smith continued in his position.

== 21st Century Fox ==
In May 2016, Smith was tapped to serve as the head of public affairs for 21st Century Fox. He began the position in July 2016 and was in charge of overseeing worldwide legislative, regulatory and strategic policy for the company. While based in Washington, D.C., and New York City, he oversaw the policy offices of the company in the United States, Hong Kong, Brussels and the UK. He was a member of the senior leadership team and reported to Fox CEO James Murdoch and co-chairman Lachlan Murdoch.

== Other activities ==
In 2006, Smith co-founded an interactive bipartisan political website called HotSoup.com with his Glover Park Group partners and former Republican political advisors Mark McKinnon and Matthew Dowd. The site intended to have a networking component and feature community leaders of all political affiliations.

Smith has been featured as an expert in The New York Times, The Washington Post, MSNBC.com, The Washington Times, the Chicago Tribune, and AP Online. He has also appeared as a commentator on television and radio programs, including MSNBC, NBC News, Anderson Cooper 360°, Fox News, and Polioptics.

Smith serves on the Board of Trustees for Colby College, the Board of Directors for the Motion Picture Association of America, the Governing Board for The Protestant Episcopal Cathedral Foundation and the Board of The Thomas G. Labrecque Foundation. He lives in Washington, D.C., with his wife and two children.
