= Blue shift (politics) =

Observed phenomenon in United States politics

In American politics, a blue shift, also called a red mirage, is an observed phenomenon under which counts of in-person votes are more likely than overall vote counts to be for the Republican Party (whose party color is red), while provisional votes or absentee ballots, which are often counted later, are more likely than overall vote counts to be for the Democratic Party (whose color is blue). This means that election day results can initially indicate a Republican is ahead, but adding provisional ballots and absentee ballots into the count can eventually show a Democratic victory.

Confusion about the blue shift phenomenon has led some Republicans to call the legitimacy of elections into question. The shift occurs because young voters, low-income voters, and voters who relocate often are likely to both vote provisionally and lean Democratic. This phenomenon remains poorly understood by the general public, and can cause confusion, given that Americans are accustomed to learning projected results on election day, and often times assume the projected results announced then are an accurate representation of final results.

== Background ==
The phenomenon was first identified by Edward Foley of Ohio State University in 2013. He found that Democratic candidates are significantly more likely to gain votes during the "canvass" period, which is the votes counted after election night. This asymmetry has not always existed; in the 20th century, as recently as the 1996 United States presidential election, Republicans and Democrats were both able to cut their opponents' leads during the canvass period. Foley conjectured that the 2002 enactment of the Help America Vote Act accelerated the pronounced asymmetry of the blue shift phenomenon, because it required states to allow provisional ballots to be cast.

He later found that the variation in the size of the blue shift is positively associated with the number of provisional ballots and Democratic partisanship of the state in question. The growth in the persistent blue-shifted overtime vote began with the 2004 United States presidential election. However, Foley has stated that political scientists have not fully "pinned down causality" of this phenomenon. Foley did not find that mail-in or absentee votes favored either party.

As results are tabulated on election night, smaller and more rural jurisdictions have fewer ballots to tabulate, so can complete reporting faster. Thus, early results often lean conservative as larger counties take their time to process ballots. One notable instance of this occurring was the 2010 California Attorney General election. Republican Steve Cooley was up by several points with Los Angeles and Alameda counties, two of the state's largest, scheduled to report most of their ballots around midnight. In order to meet evening newscasts, Cooley declared victory at 11 pm, but continuing results from the urban counties led to the race being declared too close to call by most media outlets, and Cooley ultimately losing to Democrat Kamala Harris by 0.7 percentage points.

States vary in their rules for processing mail-in ballots. While some require they be received by the elections office by election day, others allow them to arrive later and still be counted, provided they are postmarked by election day. Some states allow ballots to be processed as they are delivered, while some force elections offices to wait until election day to verify signatures and open envelopes. These factors can influence the difference between the vote that is announced on election night and that counted later.

== 2018 elections ==
One example is the 2018 California 39th congressional district election. This was a closely contested race for an open seat in the United States House of Representatives that included portions of Orange, Los Angeles, and San Bernardino counties in Southern California. Republican Young Kim was running against Democrat Gil Cisneros. On election night, November 6, Kim held a lead of 3 percentage points and over 15,000 votes over Cisneros. However, as the votes were counted over the ensuing weeks, Cisneros overtook Kim in the vote count, and won the election. A blue shift occurred in other California races as well – Republican House incumbents Jeff Denham, Mimi Walters and David Valadao were all leading on election night, but ended up losing as mail-in ballots skewed heavily in favor of their Democratic challengers.

Another notable example of the blue shift was the 2018 United States Senate election in Arizona between Republican Martha McSally and Democrat Kyrsten Sinema. McSally led the vote count on election night, but Sinema ultimately won the election due to mail-in ballots. Democrats initially thought that they had lost that election, when they had actually won. In addition to these examples, the shift has been documented in California, Pennsylvania, Oregon, and Ohio, among other states.

== 2020 elections ==
Foley expressed concern that this phenomenon, along with difficulties in conducting the election during a pandemic, could lead to "a perfect storm" in the 2020 United States presidential election. This concern was particularly pronounced due to the fact that incumbent president Donald Trump did not state before the election whether he would accept the election results. Given Trump's repeated attacks on mail balloting, nonpartisan experts warned that he could attempt to block the blue shift by building up a lead among ballots cast on Election Day, and then disputing the legitimacy of mail-in and absentee ballots.

The United States Postal Service had cost-cutting policies put in place by its new director Louis DeJoy, who was a top donor and fundraiser to Donald Trump, and these cost-cutting policies further slowed delivery of postal ballots. Trump had openly stated that he opposed USPS funding, specifically to prevent mail-in ballots, due to his fears that it could hurt his chances of re-election. These changes have become known as the 2020 United States Postal Service crisis. Some accused Trump of "intentionally kneecapping the postal service in an attempt to sabotage the election."

These concerns were echoed by former president Barack Obama, who described Trump's threats as "unheard of". For this reason, election experts advocated that postal ballots be mailed weeks in advance of Election Day. As an alternative solution, Jamelle Bouie of The New York Times advocated that Democrats vote in person if they were able.

=== Predictions ===
U.S. data and analytics company Hawkfish predicted that on election night in 2020, U.S. Republican Party nominee and presidential incumbent Donald Trump would receive more in-person votes than Joe Biden, his Democratic party nominee and principal challenger, but when absentee, provisional, and mail-in ballots were counted, the election would swing against Trump in a classic "red mirage" or "blue shift" scenario. Hawkfish's survey asked 17,263 American voters whether they planned to use absentee ballots or go to the polls. Asked about the scenario, Trump campaign communications director Tim Murtaugh told reporters, "The news media should get out of the business of predicting the future."

=== Vote counts ===
Within hours after the earliest poll closings on the evening of November 3, 2020, Trump claimed victory in several states that had him leading, but in which his margins were shrinking as mail-in ballots were counted. At 2:30 a.m. EST Wednesday, speaking to supporters, he said, "We want all voting to stop." At the time he had a lead in Michigan of 300,000 votes and one in Pennsylvania of 690,000 votes. Wisconsin was also seeing a red mirage, but the Associated Press called the state for Biden at 4:40 a.m. after a ballot dump of 69,000 absentee ballots turned Trump's 31,000-vote lead into a narrow lead for Biden, that would be impossible for the outstanding vote total to surpass.

By 8:30 a.m., with counting of absentee ballots underway, Biden had pulled ahead in Michigan and cut Trump's lead in Pennsylvania to 610,000 votes; as Biden continued to increase his lead in Michigan, the Associated Press called the state for him at 5:56 p.m. EST. At 11:25 a.m. EST on November 7, four days after Election Night, ABC News, NBC News, CBS News, the Associated Press, CNN and Fox News all called the election for Biden based on his large lead in Pennsylvania and the fact that the outstanding vote total, mostly from heavily Democratic areas, would be nearly impossible for Trump to overcome.

== 2022 elections ==
After the January 6 Capitol attack, Democrats repeatedly sounded the alarm that this phenomenon in the last two election cycles could lead to "a perfect storm" in the 2022 United States elections, stating the blue shift would decide the election. This concern was particularly pronounced because 291 GOP candidates refused to accept election results, and nonpartisan experts warned that they planned to build up a lead among ballots cast on Election Day, claim victory, and then say, "stop counting ballots because all those absentee ballots are illegitimate", thus disallowing the likely blue shift.

In the end, Democrats showed unexpected and historic strength in state-level and senatorial elections. 2022 was the first midterm since 1934 in which the president's party did not lose any state legislative chambers or incumbent senators, and the Democrats did so under a Democratic president after winning in Nevada, Arizona, and Pennsylvania. It was also the first midterm since 1986 in which either party achieved a net gain of governorships while holding the presidency, and the first time ever in a disadvantageous position. It was later revealed that young voters helped save the Democrats, and without them they would lose both chambers of Congress.

== In other countries ==
There are differing reports in other countries as to whether mail-in or early ballots have a notably different political makeup than election day in-person votes. In Germany, mail-in voters tend to be more urban than in-person voters, tend to be more certain about their voting decisions, and favor bigger parties. A "shift" does not usually feature in news coverage, as both in-person and mail-in votes are counted beginning at 18:00 when polling booths close. Mail-in votes that arrive later than 18:00 on election day are discarded – even if they only arrived late due to circumstances outside of the control of voters.

However, given that exit polls are based only on in-person voters, the first prognosis of the election result, which is released immediately after polls close, often differs from the final result, due to, among other reasons, the effect of mail-in ballots. The 2020 Bavarian local elections had their runoff election held as all mail-in (due to the COVID-19 pandemic), and some observers discounted that it had any partisan effect.

Germany has seen an increase of mail-in voting at federal elections since their introduction in 1957 from less than one in twenty in 1957 to more than one in four in 2017. In the May round of the 2016 Austrian presidential election, exit polls correctly pointed to a narrow lead for Norbert Hofer among those who voted at a polling station. The postal votes, which made up about 12% of the total vote, were slightly but definitively in favour of his rival Alexander Van der Bellen, and ultimately gave Van der Bellen victory.

== See also ==
- Bush v. Gore
- Dewey Defeats Truman
- Shy Tory factor
- Swing (politics)
