= East Mecklenburg High School =

American public school in North Carolina

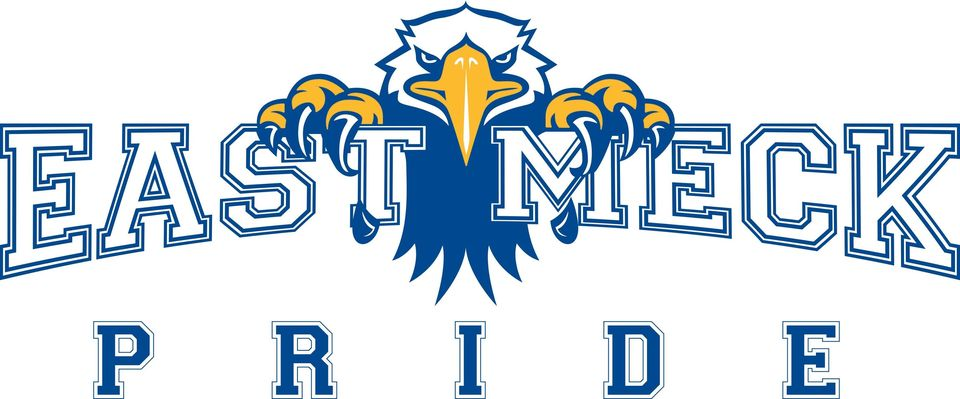

Location
- 6800 Monroe Rd; Charlotte, North Carolina 28212; United States; 35°10′34″N 80°45′33″W

Information
- Other name: East Meck; East
- Type: Public
- Established: 1950 (76 years ago)
- CEEB code: 342535
- Principal: Steve Drye
- Staff: 129.53 (on an FTE basis)
- Enrollment: 2,372 (2023–2024)
- Student to teacher ratio: 18.31
- Colors: Blue and yellow
- Athletics: NCHSAA 8A
- Athletics conference: Southwestern 7A/8A
- Mascot: Eagle
- Newspaper: eastmeckeagle.com
- Website: eastmecklenburghs.cmsk12.org

East Mecklenburg High School is a public secondary school in Charlotte, North Carolina, United States, and one of 21 high schools in the Charlotte-Mecklenburg Schools system. The principal of the school is Steven "Steve" Drye. East Mecklenburg High School is a partial magnet school in Charlotte-Mecklenburg Schools. It is part of the International Baccalaureate program. East Mecklenburg students come from many middle school areas such as Albemarle Road, Carmel, Queens Grant, Crestdale, Eastway, J.T. Williams, McClintock, Mint Hill, Randolph, Northeast, and Northridge.

== History ==
Founded in 1950, East Mecklenburg had grades 10, 11, and 12 until the 1997–98 school year, when ninth graders were added. East Mecklenburg served as the high school for all of eastern Mecklenburg County until 1989, when Providence High School opened.

== Student profile ==
East Mecklenburg High (or simply East Meck or East) touts one of the most diverse student bodies in Charlotte. For the 2011–2012 school year, the school of 1,686 students reported the following racial breakdown to CMS: 48.27% African-American, 23.90% White, 17.02% Hispanic, 6.29% Asian and Pacific/Hawaiian Islanders, 3.80% Multi-racial, and 0.71% American Indian/Alaskan Native.

== Classes ==
East Mecklenburg offers a wide array of classes to its students. The most challenging are those found in its International Baccalaureate program and its 23 Advanced Placement courses. The school also hosts a top-notch special education department, known as its Exceptional Children program. More than 30 faculty members serve as resources and assistants in the program. The AutoTech program and Culinary department offer technical skills courses to those students not interested in intensive college prep.

East Mecklenburg is one of five high schools in North Carolina that has an Academy of Engineering program. Over 20 students were accepted into the program which began in the fall of 2011. The program has been carefully designed to introduce students to a wide variety of engineering principles, PLTW classes for the program include; Introduction of Engineering Design, Principles of Engineering, Civil Engineering & Architecture, Bio-technical Engineering, and Engineering Design and Development.

== Athletics ==
East Mecklenburg is a member of the North Carolina High School Athletic Association (NCHSAA) and is classified as an 8A school. It is a part of the Southwestern 7A/8A Conference. Team colors are blue and yellow and the school mascot is an eagle.

In 2008, the boys' basketball team won the NCHSAA 4A state championship, defeating the Apex High School Cougars 73–61.

The East Meck rugby team won the 2008 Division II State Championship, and in its second full year, won the 2009 Division I state championship after defeating crosstown rival Myers Park in the title game. In 2010 they were runners-up for Division I State Championship's losing to West Mecklenburg High School 25–12.

The boys' cross country team have won six cross country state titles, including a three-peat from 1990–92. Members of East Meck cross country designed and built Charlotte's McAlpine Greenway Park cross country course, the site of major meets such as the Wendy's Invitational and the Southern regional qualifying race of the Foot Locker Cross Country Championships.

=== State Championships ===
- Boys Basketball: 2008
- Boys Cross Country: 1960, 1973, 1986, 1990, 1991, 1992
- Girls Cross Country: 1982
- Football: 1977
- Boys Indoor Track & Field: 2000
- Girls Indoor Track & Field: 1991
- Boys Outdoor Track & Field: 1997
- Boys Soccer: 1968, 1969
- Girls Swimming & Diving: 1989
- Boys Tennis: 1973, 1975

== Awards ==
Based on its proportion of graduating seniors taking AP and IB tests, East was ranked among the 500 top high schools in the nation by Newsweek.

Also frequently earning awards is East Meck's culinary program. Since 2005, East's culinary team has won gold medals in state and national competition. In April 2008, senior Luis Rojas was named the National High School Chef of the Year by Johnson & Wales University in the dessert category, garnering him more than $80,000 in scholarship money.

The Eagle, East Mecklenburg's school newspaper, was named a Paper of Distinction in 2008 by the North Carolina Scholastic Media Association.

== Notable alumni ==
- Brad Anderson, professional wrestler, son of Gene Anderson
- Rodney Austin, former NFL offensive tackle
- Byron Dinkins, former NBA player
- Mike Fox, head baseball coach at the University of North Carolina, one of only six men to play in and then coach his alma mater to the College World Series
- Evan Harding, professional soccer player for the Charlotte Eagles
- Carter Heyward, paved the way for the recognition of women as priests in the Episcopal Church
- Jeremy Ingram, professional basketball player
- Macoumba Kandji, professional soccer player
- Jennifer Loven, journalist and former White House press correspondent for the Associated Press
- Joan Nesbit, cross country national champion and United States representative at the 1996 Summer Olympics in the 10,000-meter run
- Jim Gulley, politician
- Luke Little, professional baseball pitcher for the Chicago Cubs of MLB
- Richard Edwin Parris Jr., member of alternative metal grunge band Animal Bag
- Eddie Payne, college basketball coach
- Mike Pope, former NFL coach, 4-time Super Bowl champion as tight end coach with the New York Giants
- Joe Posnanski, American sports journalist
- Jeff Reed, former NFL kicker for the Pittsburgh Steelers and 2-time Super Bowl champion
- Dustin Rhodes, aka "Golddust", best known for his multiple tenures with the WWE and also currently a wrestler for AEW
- Jennifer Roberts, politician, community activist, and the 58th Mayor of Charlotte
- Richard Vinroot, politician, attorney, and the 52nd Mayor of Charlotte
- Earl Wentz, pianist, composer, and musical director
- Barry Windham, professional wrestler, son of Blackjack Mulligan
