= Jennifer Loven =

American journalist

Jennifer Loven is an American journalist and a former White House press correspondent for the Associated Press (AP) and current managing director at the Glover Park Group, a Washington, D.C.–based strategic communications firm.

Born in Matthews, North Carolina, Loven graduated from East Mecklenburg High School and then attended the University of Virginia and Northwestern University, where she was graduated from the Medill School of Journalism.

After college, Loven began working for Associated Press in Detroit, Michigan. She covered locally for two years, then moved to the Michigan Legislature. After relocating to Washington, D.C. in 1997, she reported on the Pentagon and Congress until her assignment to the White House press corps in 2002. Loven reported regularly from the White House for the rest of her tenure at AP, and served as the president of the White House Correspondents' Association.
