= Jake Siewert =

American political advisor

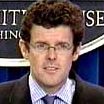

22nd White House Press Secretary
- In office September 30, 2000 – January 20, 2001
- President: Bill Clinton
- Deputy: Vacant
- Preceded by: Joe Lockhart
- Succeeded by: Ari Fleischer

White House Deputy Press Secretary
- In office August 4, 1998 – September 29, 2000
- President: Bill Clinton
- Secretary: Joe Lockhart
- Succeeded by: Scott McClellan

Personal details
- Born: February 1, 1964 (age 62) New York City, U.S.
- Party: Democratic
- Spouse: Christine Anderson
- Education: Yale University (BA)

Richard L. "Jake" Siewert Jr. (born February 1, 1964) is an American political advisor serving as the head of corporate communications for investment bank Goldman Sachs. He served as the 22nd White House Press Secretary and the last of the Clinton administration and later in the Treasury department during the Obama Administration.

== Early life and education ==
Siewert was born in New York City. In 1986, he graduated summa cum laude from Yale University with a degree in the humanities. He later attended Emory University, studying comparative literature and philosophy, and the University of California, Berkeley, studying law for three years, but did not earn an advanced degree.

== Career ==
Siewert began his career in Washington as communications director for the Democratic Governors Association in 1991.

From 1993 to 2001, Siewert held several positions during the Clinton administration, including serving as a special assistant to the president for economic affairs, working at the National Economic Council. He was deputy White House press secretary when White House Press Secretary Joe Lockhart resigned on September 20, 2000. Siewert handled the press secretary duties from September 30, 2000, to January 20, 2001, the final 112 days of the Clinton administration.

Siewert was with aluminum giant Alcoa from 2001 to 2009 in various positions. He joined as head of global communications and public strategy, and later oversaw the company's global environment, health and safety efforts for several years. Lastly, he served as vice president for Business Development, overseeing global mergers and acquisitions and focusing on growth in China and emerging economies.

In June 2009, Siewert joined the Obama administration in a position advising Treasury Secretary Timothy Geithner. In that position, he also acted as his liaison to the business community, which lasted until 2011.

In March 2012, Siewert was appointed as global head of corporate communications for investment bank Goldman Sachs, succeeding Lucas van Praag. An early task from the board to Siewert was to be the "rebranding" of chief executive Lloyd Blankfein, whose three-year tenure has been marked by challenges to the firm and to Blankfein himself.

== Personal life ==
Siewert is married to Christine Anderson, who is head of global public affairs for Blackstone Group. Anderson previously served as communications director for former New York Governor Eliot Spitzer during the 2006 New York gubernatorial election and later as Press Secretary to Governor Spitzer. Anderson also worked in the press office of the Clinton White House.

Siewert and Anderson bought a $7.03 million condo in Manhattan's Greenwich Village from Scholastic CEO Richard Robinson.

Political offices
Preceded by Joe Lockhart	White House Press Secretary; 2000–2001	Succeeded by Ari Fleischer
