= The Glover Park Group =

American communications consulting firm

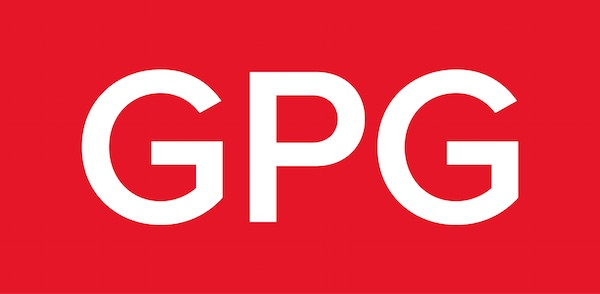
- Type: Subsidiary
- Industry: Public relations
- Founded: June 2001; 25 years ago
- Founder: Carter Eskew; Michael Feldman; Joe Lockhart; Chip Smith
- Defunct: January 1, 2021
- Fate: Merged with Finsbury and Hering Schuppener
- Successor: Finsbury Glover Hering
- Headquarters: Washington, D.C. New York City; Los Angeles; Boulder, Colorado
- Key people: Michael Feldman (CEO), Cara McVie (CFO)
- Parent: WPP
- Website: gpg.com

The Glover Park Group was an American communications consulting firm headquartered in Washington, D.C. The company was founded in 2001 by former White House and Democratic Party campaign officials Carter Eskew, Michael Feldman, Joe Lockhart, and Chip Smith. In January 2021, the firm merged with Finsbury and Hering Schuppener to form Finsbury Glover Hering, which itself later merged in December 2021 with New York City-based Sard Verbinnen & Co to form FGS Global.

== Operations ==
The firm's services include lobbying, public relations, advertising, marketing, government relations and policy counsel, crisis management and opinion research. The firm provides integrated strategic communications and advocacy services to corporations, non-profit organizations, trade associations, governments and issue and industry coalitions. Notable clients have included the National Football League, Pfizer, the United States Telecom Association, Visa, the Alliance for Climate Protection, Microsoft, the Saudi government, and Verizon Wireless.

The firm's leadership includes founding partners Carter Eskew, Michael Feldman, Joe Lockhart, Chip Smith, and former White House official Joel Johnson, who leads the firm's government relations practice. Other notable employees include former Associated Press White House correspondents Jennifer Loven and Nedra Pickler, both managing directors in the firm's public affairs division) Notable former employees include Howard Wolfson and former White House press secretary Dee Dee Myers.

In November 2011, the firm was acquired by WPP plc, a London-based communications services company. In statements released by both companies, it was confirmed that founding partners Eskew, Feldman and Smith would remain in their leadership positions.

== Areas of business ==
=== Public relations and communications ===
The firm provides strategic communications campaigns for corporations, non-profit organizations and industry associations. The firm has also provided crisis management services to high-profile clients. In 2006, the Society for Worldwide Interbank Financial Telecommunication (SWIFT) consulted with the company for crisis management, following debate over tracking of financial records for anti-terror purposes. In March 2010, Toyota hired The Glover Park Group to handle the response to a recall of more than eight million of its vehicles due to faulty accelerator pedals. In 2016, Smith left Glover Park Group to take a role at 21st Century Fox.

=== Advertising and marketing ===
The company has produced television, radio, print and online advertising campaigns and digital content for companies and non-profits. Key digital efforts have included a website developed for the Alliance for Climate Protection, which was used to collect tens of thousands of stories on climate change and green energy from the general public, celebrities and business leaders.

=== Government affairs ===
The firm began providing government and legislative affairs services in early 2005; its bipartisan legislative affairs practice is headed by Joel Johnson. Specific services include advocacy and legislative strategy. Early notable advocacy clients included the Recording Industry Association of America, for whom it lobbied to stop copyright infringement of music, and Nextel Communications, for whom it lobbied on telecommunications issues. The firm has also lobbied on behalf of French food services company Sodexho Alliance in 2007, and in January 2009, Whole Foods Market hired the firm to handle its lobbying efforts in its antitrust case against the Federal Trade Commission. The company also provides consultancy services to governments. In 2005, it advised Turkey on that country's relationship with the U.S. government. Also in 2005, The firm was hired by the Taipei Economic and Cultural Representative Office to build relationships between Taiwan and members of the media and policy makers in the United States. The firm has also provided consultancy services to the government of Dubai.

== History ==
=== Foundation ===
The Glover Park Group was founded in June 2001 by Michael Feldman, Carter Eskew, Joe Lockhart and Chip Smith. The company was named after the Glover Park area of Washington, D.C., where its first offices were located. The founders had served as officials in the Clinton White House and on the presidential campaign of former vice president Al Gore. Lockhart was the former press secretary to Bill Clinton and Feldman had worked in the White House for Gore. Eskew and Smith had worked on Gore's campaign staff for the 2000 presidential election as his chief strategist and deputy campaign manager, respectively. Eskew and Lockhart both had experience at a public affairs advocacy company.

Initially the company focused on providing integrated campaign services to corporate clients, foundations and special-interest groups. Early work also included collaboration with other companies, such as political consultancy Shrum, Devine & Donilon.

=== Early work ===
The company's early projects included several high-profile advertising campaigns for corporate clients. In January 2002, The Glover Park Group produced a television commercial for Diageo PLC, advertising its Smirnoff vodka brand while promoting social responsibility and designated driving. Media reports, including from the Wall Street Journal, described it as a "landmark", as this was the first U.S. network television commercial for a distilled beverage in several decades. The following month, the group launched another television advertising campaign, promoting high-definition television. In May 2002, The Glover Park Group produced a national advertisement campaign for tire safety, funded by the settlement of a lawsuit brought against Bridgestone and its subsidiary, Firestone, by all 50 U.S. states. In early 2003, the company opened a New York office, led by Howard Wolfson, who had previously been executive director at the Democratic Congressional Campaign Committee. Through the early to mid-2000s, The Glover Park Group carried out a range of communication and consultancy work, including promotion of Michael Moore's documentary Fahrenheit 9/11 in May 2004, and preparation work for then-Senator Hillary Clinton for her re-election campaign of 2006.

=== Company expansion ===
In January 2005, The Glover Park Group opened a legislative affairs practice, which is headed by Joel Johnson, the former senior advisor for policy and communications for Bill Clinton. The company continued its expansion into the late 2000s, and opened offices in California in April 2008. Located in West Hollywood, the offices focused on clients including entertainment companies, non-profit organizations and labor unions. Also in 2008, The Glover Park Group, which had been staffed largely by Democrats since its foundation, hired Republican strategist Kevin Madden as its senior vice president of public affairs. Madden had previously worked on Mitt Romney's 2008 presidential campaign and for George W. Bush's 2004 re-election campaign. In 2010, the firm expanded its bipartisan offering with the hiring of several prominent Republican officials from the Bush White House and the Republican congressional leadership.

== Criticism ==
The Glover Park Group has been criticized for its anti-ethanol campaign. According to the 2014 documentary film Pump, the Glover Park Group was hired by a conglomerate of organizations to discredit the biofuel industry. The Glover Park Group claimed that ethanol production replaces food production. Farmers who make ethanol say that this claim is false. Distiller's grains are a byproduct of the making of ethanol, a process in which the corn is not destroyed, but is rather converted into the two products. Distiller's grains are used as livestock feed.

In 2022, during the Russo-Ukrainian War, Glover Park Group was noted in the media for its representation of the United Arab Emirates as part of a public relations engagement. At the time, the UAE was being criticized for its perceived favoritism for the Russian position in the war.

After Abdel Fattah el-Sisi overthrew President Mohamed Morsi in the 2013 Egyptian coup, the Glover Park Group was hired by the authoritarian el-Sisi regime to promote the new administration.

In February of 2026, it came to light as part of the release of the Epstein files that the firm had been mentioned in one of the emails exchanged between the disgraced American financier, child sex offender, serial rapist, and human trafficker and American economist, former United States Secretary of the Treasury Larry Summers in 2015. In the email, Summers suggested that Epstein speak to someone at the Glover Park Group and mentioned Joe Lockhart and the work the firm had done for Bill Clinton and David Petraeus. Notably, the email is a passing mention, and there is no known communication between Epstein, Lockhart, or anyone from the firm; that didn't stop people on social media from criticizing the firm, Michael Feldman, and his wife, broadcast journalist Savannah Guthrie, for the mild footnote mention in the files.
