= Howard Wolfson =

American political strategist

Deputy Mayor of New York City for Governmental Affairs
- In office January 26, 2010 – December 31, 2013
- Mayor: Michael Bloomberg
- Preceded by: Kevin Sheekey
- Succeeded by: position abolished

Personal details
- Born: 1967 (age 58–59) Middletown, New York, U.S.
- Party: Democratic
- Spouse: Terri McCullough
- Children: 2
- Education: University of Chicago (BA); Duke University (MA)

Howard Wolfson (born 1967) is an American Democratic political strategist. He served as a counselor to the former mayor of New York City Michael Bloomberg, replacing Kevin Sheekey as deputy mayor of New York City for governmental affairs. He currently directs the education program at Bloomberg Philanthropies.

== Early life and education ==
He graduated from the University of Chicago and holds a Master of Arts in American History from Duke University.

== Career ==
Wolfson began his career in politics working for Nita Lowey as her chief of staff and press secretary, and was executive director of the Democratic Congressional Campaign Committee from 1998 to 2000. He served as communications director for the U.S. Senate campaigns of Charles Schumer (1998), Hillary Clinton (2000, 2006), and Ned Lamont (2006).

Wolfson was co-chief strategist and communications director for the Hillary Clinton 2008 presidential campaign, after which he became managing director at The Glover Park Group, a communications consulting firm based in Washington, D.C. He advised the campaign of Bill Thompson for New York City Comptroller in 2005. He was a senior strategist for New York City Mayor Michael Bloomberg's 2009 re-election campaign. Wolfson served as a strategic adviser to News Corp. in its public relations campaign against Nielsen Holdings. He was a Fox News contributor, and advised Ned Lamont's campaign for governor of Connecticut. Wolfson is also the author of the music and politics blog Gotham Acme. From August to November 2008, Wolfson wrote a blog on The New Republic's website, called "The Flack", that covered the final months of the 2008 presidential campaign. He also sits on the board of directors for The 74, an education news website.

Wolfson served as a senior advisor to the Michael Bloomberg 2020 presidential campaign.

== Personal life ==
Wolfson married fellow Democratic Party operative Terri McCullough in 2002. They have a daughter, Sarah Cate, and a son.
