= As a Woman =

2021 book by Paula Stone Williams

As a Woman: What I Learned About Power, Sex, and the Patriarchy After I Transitioned
- Author: Paula Stone Williams
- Language: English
- Genre: Memoir
- Published: 2021
- Publisher: Atria Books
- Publication place: United States
- Pages: 256
- ISBN: 9781982153342
- Website: Simon & Schuster

As a Woman: What I Learned About Power, Sex, and the Patriarchy After I Transitioned is a memoir by Paula Stone Williams, published in 2021. The book was published by Atria Publishing, which is a subsidiary of Simon & Schuster.

== Reception ==
The book has been reviewed by the NY Journal of Books, the SF Chronicle, and the Washington Blade.
