= Provisional ballot =

Ballot cast requiring further verification of voter's eligibility

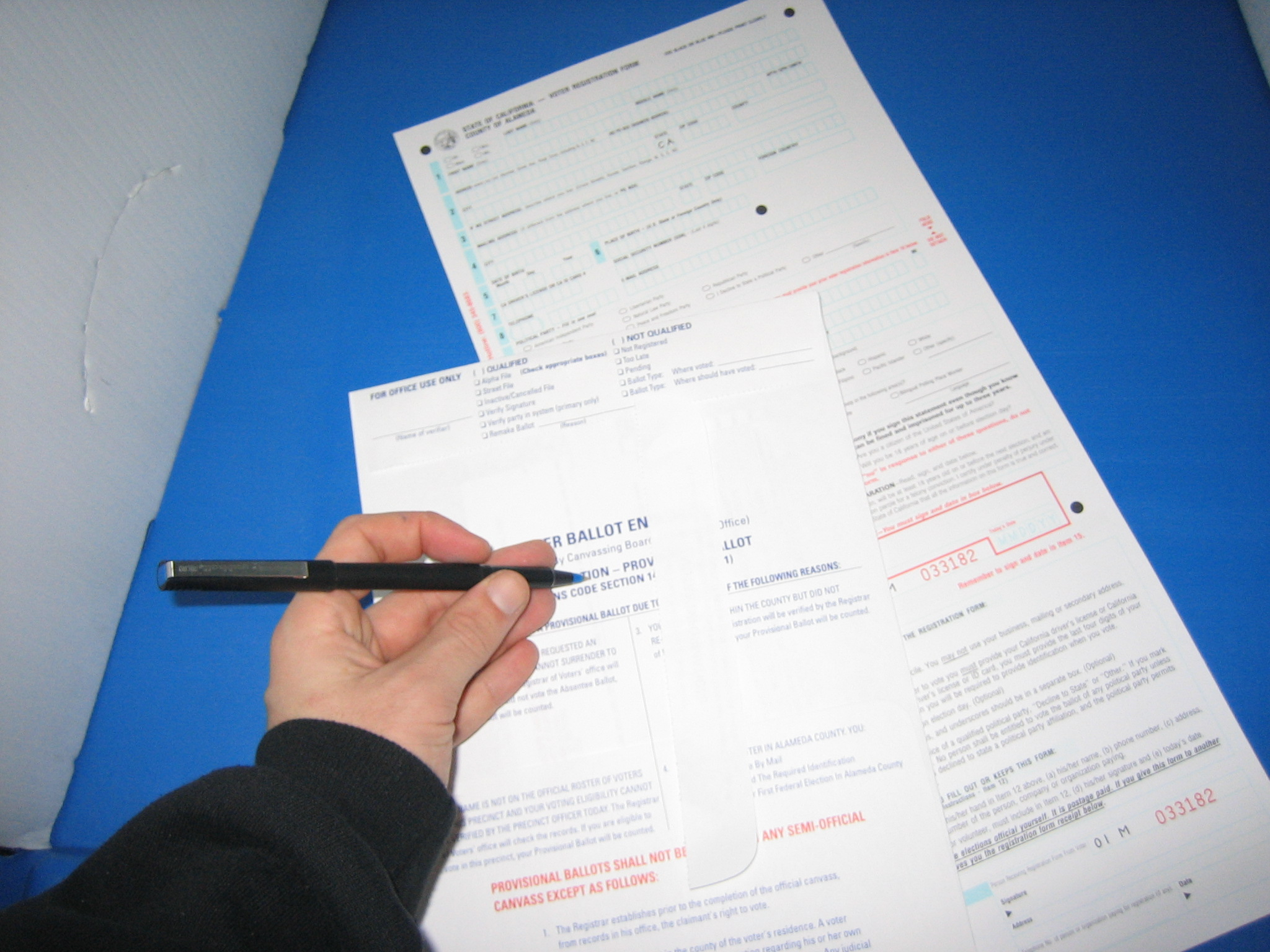
A Californian voter fills out a provisional ballot form while voting in the 2004 United States presidential election

In elections in the United States, a provisional ballot (called an affidavit ballot or challenge ballot in some states) is used to record a vote when there are questions about a given voter's eligibility that must be resolved before the vote can count. The federal Help America Vote Act of 2002 guarantees that, in most states, the voter can cast a provisional ballot if the voter states that they are entitled to vote.

Some of the most common reasons to cast a provisional ballot include:

- The voter's name does not appear on the electoral roll for the given precinct (polling place), because the voter is not registered to vote or is registered to vote elsewhere
- The voter's eligibility cannot be established or has been challenged
- The voter lacks a photo identification document (in jurisdictions that require one)
- The voter requested to vote by absentee ballot but claims to have not received, or not cast, the absentee ballot
- The voter's registration contains inaccurate or outdated information such as the wrong address or a misspelled name
- In a closed primary (limited to members of a political party), the voter's party registration is listed incorrectly

Whether a provisional ballot is counted is contingent upon the verification of that voter's eligibility, which may involve local election officials reviewing government records or asking the voter for more information, such as a photo identification not presented at the polling place or proof of residence. Each state may set its own timing rules for when these issues must be resolved. Provisional ballots therefore cannot usually be counted until after the day of the election.

== History ==
The right of political parties to have observers at polling places is long-standing. One of the established roles for such observers is to act as challengers, in the event that someone attempts to vote at the polling place who is not eligible to vote.

Before the implementation of provisional ballots, some state laws allowed a voter whose eligibility was challenged to cast a challenged ballot. After the polls closed, the canvassing board was then charged with examining the challenged ballots and determining whether the challenge was to be upheld or not.

The Help America Vote Act brings a degree of uniformity to the array of various challenged ballot rules enacted by various states. For example, each state must provide a means for the voter to find out whether their ballot was counted, though the states may use different ways of doing so (such as a website or a phone number).

Though the Act mandates the use of provisional ballots nationwide, it exempted the six states that had been exempted from the National Voter Registration Act of 1993 because those states had and continue to have either "same-day" voter registration or no registration requirement at all: Idaho, Minnesota, New Hampshire, North Dakota, Wisconsin, and Wyoming. However, those states may choose to use provisional ballots. As of 2015, North Dakota, Wisconsin, and Wyoming used them for some purposes, while the other three did not have provisional ballots at all.

== Potential problems ==
During the 2018 midterm elections, approximately 20 out of 205 provisional ballots cast in Broward County (a subset of the over 600 provisional ballots and 1.1 million total ballots cast in Broward) were rejected under signature matching requirements. After this determination, both valid and invalid provisional ballots—without enclosing envelopes—were mixed together, which provided no way for them to be separated for the recount.

Computer scientist and election official Douglas W. Jones has criticized the offer of a provisional ballot as "a way to brush off troublesome voters by letting them think they have voted." He expressed the concern that, under some states' laws, casting a provisional ballot at the wrong precinct would disenfranchise voters who could have cast valid ballots had they been redirected to the proper precinct.

Academic research has suggested that provisional ballots tend to lean more toward the Democratic Party than the electorate as a whole, and that this contributes to a phenomenon, first identified by Edward Foley known as "blue shift," under which Democrats increase their share of the vote as more ballots are counted. This can potentially result in a different outcome from the one indicated by the initial count on the night of the election. Some experts on voting have suggested that this shift could be misunderstood and lead to erroneous claims of electoral fraud or corruption.

== Rates of acceptance ==
According to the Election Assistance Commission, thousands of provisional ballots are not counted each election.

The 2004 US Presidential Election was the first presidential election conducted under the Help America Vote Act's provisions. Nationwide, at least 1.9 million provisional ballots were cast, and 676,000 were never counted due to various states' rules on counting provisional ballots.

Studies of the use of provisional ballots in the 2006 general election in the United States show that around 21% of provisional ballots were rejected. About 44% of these were cast by voters who were not registered, but many other rejections were for reasons that were "preventable," such as an incorrect precinct or missing signature.

Rates of rejection vary widely across different states, with some states counting all or nearly all provisional ballots while others reject more than half.
