= Michael Bloomberg 2020 presidential campaign =

American political campaign

- Campaign: 2020 United States presidential election (Democratic primaries)
- Candidate: Michael Bloomberg; Mayor of New York City (2002–2013)
- Affiliation: Democratic Party
- EC formed: November 21, 2019
- Announced: November 24, 2019
- Suspended: March 4, 2020
- Headquarters: 229 West 43rd Street (8th floor), New York City
- Key people: Kevin Sheekey – campaign manager Kelly Mehlenbacher – deputy COO; Advisors: Howard Wolfson; Jason Schecter
- Receipts: US$1,119,411,494.07 (12/31/2019)
- Slogan(s): Rebuild America; Fighting for our future A new choice for Democrats; Mike Will Get It Done; I like Mike

Website
- mikebloomberg.com (archived - December 30, 2019)

The 2020 presidential campaign of Michael Bloomberg commenced in November 2019, later than most other campaigns for the 2020 Democratic presidential nomination. Bloomberg opted not to compete in the early states of Iowa, New Hampshire, Nevada, and South Carolina, instead beginning his campaign with the Super Tuesday states. He financed the campaign himself, spending more than $1 billion and refusing campaign donations. His campaign heavily relied on advertising, including the use of nationally aired television ads, social media influencers, and billboards in high-visibility locations.

On Super Tuesday (March 3, 2020), when Democratic primaries were held in 14 states, Bloomberg won only the territory of American Samoa. He also missed the 15% threshold for proportional delegates in several states. Bloomberg ended his campaign on March 4, 2020, endorsed former Vice President Joe Biden for the Democratic nomination, and announced an effort to use his campaign infrastructure to support Biden's primary bid and the eventual Democratic nominee. Bloomberg's lack of success with voters was attributed to poor debate performances; his one-time approval of stop-and-frisk in New York City; and allegations of a sexist working environment at his company, Bloomberg LP.

== Background ==
Michael Bloomberg is a billionaire businessman who served as mayor of New York City from 2002 to 2013. At various times in his life, he has been a Democrat, a Republican, and an independent.

On March 5, 2019, Bloomberg announced that he would not run for president in 2020; instead, he encouraged the Democratic Party to "nominate a Democrat who will be in the strongest position to defeat Donald Trump". Sometime during the spring of 2019, Bloomberg also founded Hawkfish, a data and tech start-up focused on supporting Democratic candidates. The company was reportedly active in Virginia and Kentucky elections, before shifting focus to the Bloomberg campaign.

On October 14, 2019, a day before the Democratic Party's fourth presidential debate, it was reported that Bloomberg was "still looking at" entering the race if Joe Biden were to drop out, but that "nothing can happen unless Biden drops out", according to an unnamed source reported to be close to the situation.

Fellow billionaire Warren Buffett had expressed his approval of a potential Bloomberg presidential campaign as early as February 2019.

=== Activities prior to campaign launch ===
On November 7, 2019, Bloomberg announced that he was taking steps to enter the 2020 United States presidential election. On November 19, he gave three separate donations of $106,500 each to the Democratic National Committee, along with $800,000 to the Democratic Grassroots Victory Fund. Bloomberg stated that he would begin his campaign with the Super Tuesday states, not competing in Iowa or New Hampshire. He did not attend his company's second annual New Economy Forum in Beijing on November 20, a sign that his developing presidential campaign was now "dead serious". The summit was on the same day as one of the Democratic presidential primary debates in Atlanta.

The campaign was headquartered at facilities provided by Bloomberg Philanthropies.

On November 21, 2019, Bloomberg filed a statement of candidacy with the Federal Election Commission to declare himself as a Democratic candidate for president. Bloomberg stated that this was not a formal announcement, but a step towards making one if he decided to run.

== Campaign history ==
Bloomberg officially declared his candidacy on November 24, 2019 during a campaign event in Virginia as well as in a YouTube campaign spot touting himself as a "doer and a problem solver". The campaign subsequently kicked off a television advertising campaign in about 100 markets within the Super Tuesday states, which were to contribute about 40 percent of total pledged delegates at the Democratic National Convention.

Bloomberg announced that he would finance his campaign personally, and would not accept donations. In addition to spending on advertising, Bloomberg's campaign set aside between $15 million to $20 million to register a half million voters in five battleground states that had swung to Trump in 2016.

According to editor-in-chief John Micklethwait of Bloomberg News, because of Bloomberg's ownership of the News (which refrains from investigating its owner) as well as his candidacy in the Democratic Party primaries, it would refrain from investigating Bloomberg's rival candidates throughout the primaries. If "credible journalistic institutions" published investigative reporting about any of the candidates, the News stated that it would "either publish those articles in full or summarize them", Micklethwait said. The Bloomberg Industry Group union, which does not represent News journalists, protested the ban. In response, the Trump administration decredentialed News reporters from attending further 2020 Trump campaign events.

Despite its promise not to investigate Bloomberg's presidential rivals, the news agency published a critical report on the Bernie Sanders and Elizabeth Warren campaigns. Sanders campaign speechwriter David Sirota joined journalists in slamming the report. The article noted that Bloomberg had not yet released his first campaign spending report.

Bloomberg led the midnight vote in the tiny townships of Dixville Notch, New Hampshire. Although not on the ballot in the 2020 New Hampshire Democratic primary, Bloomberg received three write-in votes in Dixville Notch: two in the Democratic primary and one in the Republican primary.

=== Debates ===
Bloomberg declared his candidacy after most of the 2019 primary debates organized by the Democratic National Committee had already taken place. After declaring, he failed to meet the DNC's donor requirements to participate in the December 2019 and January 2020 debates, as he was not accepting contributions.

On January 31, 2020, the DNC changed its eligibility rules, eliminating the individual-donor threshold. This change allowed Bloomberg to participate in future debates by merely meeting polling requirements.

==== February 19, 2020 debate ====
On February 18, 2020, Bloomberg qualified to participate in the February 19 debate in Nevada. Bloomberg's debut debate performance was poorly received, with some pundits saying that his performance was "among the worst in the history of presidential debates". He was widely criticized for his answers regarding stop-and-frisk, workplace harassment, and allegations of harassment by female employees, many of whom were bound by non-disclosure agreements. Elizabeth Warren and Joe Biden challenged him to release the women from the non-disclosure agreements, and Bloomberg refused. It was reported that there were at least 64 women named in at least 40 lawsuits alleging sexual harassment or gender discrimination at Bloomberg LP.

After the debate, at a rally in Salt Lake City, Utah, Bloomberg stated that "Trump was the real winner of Las Vegas debate", and claimed that, "If we choose a candidate who appeals to a small base like Senator Sanders, it will be a fatal error".

=== "Super Tuesday" results and suspension of campaign ===
In the March 3, 2020 "Super Tuesday" primaries, Bloomberg finished in third or fourth place in most of the 14 states involved, picking up a total of 61 delegates out of the more than 1,000 that were available. On March 4, 2020, Bloomberg suspended his campaign, stating, "I'm a believer in using data to inform decisions. After yesterday's results, the delegate math has become virtually impossible—and a viable path to the nomination no longer exists." Bloomberg then endorsed Joe Biden.

Following the suspension of his campaign, Bloomberg donated money to nonprofits which register people of color to vote. This includes a $2 million donation to Collective Future, a group that registers black voters, and a $500,000 donation to Voto Latino, which registers young Latinos as voters.

== Spending and advertising ==
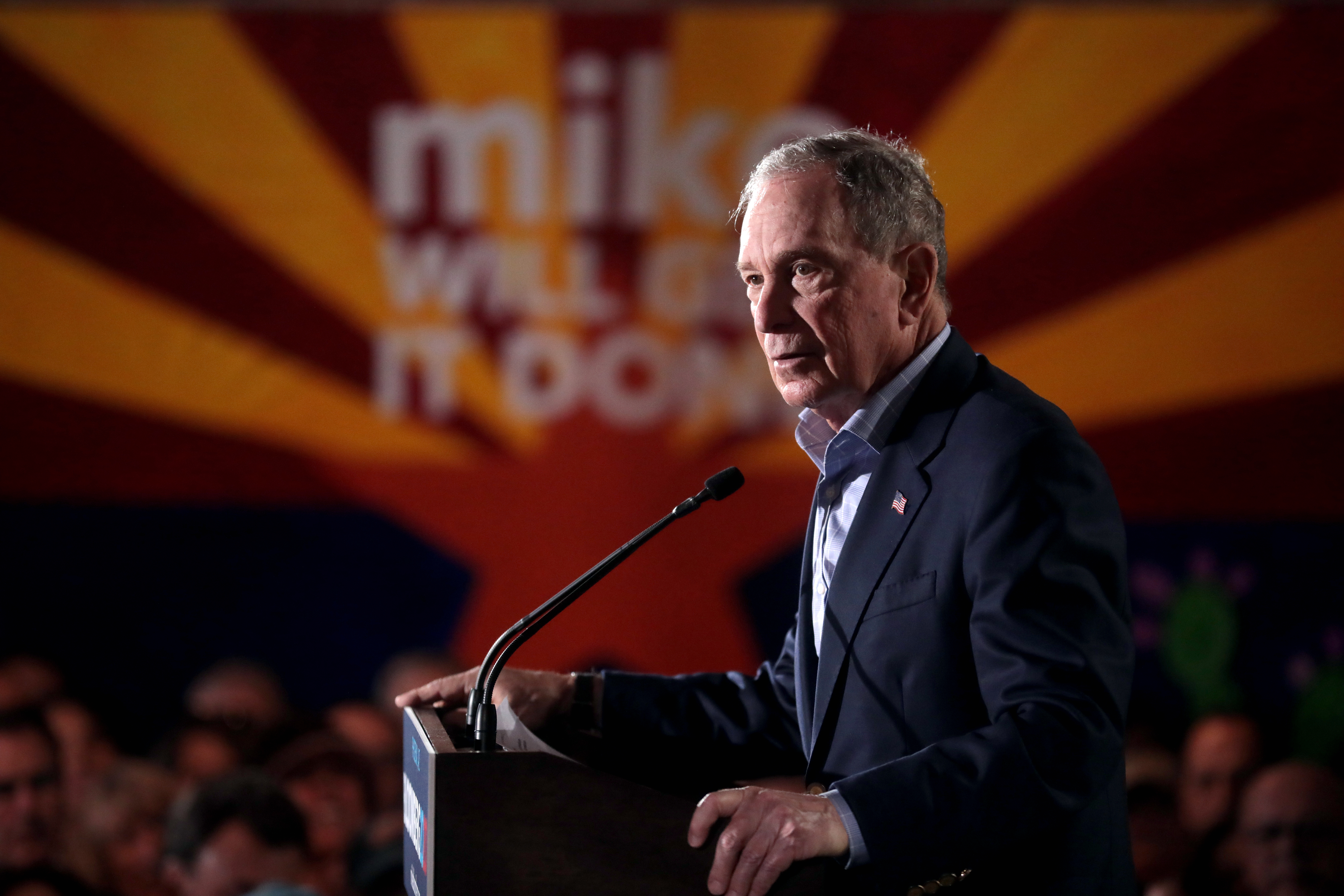
Bloomberg speaking at a campaign event in Phoenix, Arizona, in February 2020

Bloomberg decided on an unconventional primary strategy; he chose not to compete in the four states that had primaries or caucuses in February 2020, but to focus his efforts on the multi-state primary elections in March on what is known as Super Tuesday. Following the Iowa caucuses, after a delay in reporting the results produced a chaotic and uncertain outcome, he decided to double his television advertising in all the markets where he was already spending and to increase his campaign staff to 2,000 people.

In the fourth quarter of 2019, Bloomberg spent $188 million on his presidential campaign. That amount included $132 million on television ads; $8.2 million on digital ads; $3.3 million on polling; $1.5 million on rent; and $757,000 on airfare, including $646,000 for a private jet. By the end of January 2020, Bloomberg had spent a total of $300 million on his campaign. By February 2020, his total spending had exceeded $500 million. Bloomberg's spending caused the total spending in the presidential primary on behalf of all candidates to exceed $1 billion by February, an unprecedented figure for such an early point in a U.S. presidential election.

Bloomberg spent a total of more than $1 billion on his campaign. As of April 2020, this amount exceeded the combined campaign spending of all the other Democratic candidates in the 2020 presidential election.

=== Television ads ===
The Bloomberg campaign launched campaign ads in markets in every state nationally on December 4, 2019. By December 31, 2019—five weeks after declaring his candidacy—Bloomberg had spent or committed $200 million on advertising, producing "an onslaught of campaign commercials with no precedent in Democratic politics".

Bloomberg spent $10 million on a 60-second ad slot during Super Bowl LIV that aired on February 2, 2020.

=== Digital and social media campaigns ===
Bloomberg's digital campaign set aside $100 million for anti-Trump social media ads in swing states. By January 2020, Bloomberg had spent an estimated $15 million on pay-per-click Google ads promoting his campaign on search results for terms including "impeachment", "climate change", and "gun safety". In January 2020, Bloomberg spent $8.53 million in targeted Facebook ads.

In addition to running digital ads, Bloomberg's campaign recruited social media influencers to advertise online. The campaign used Tribe, a content marketplace for brands to solicit content from social media personalities, to offer a $150 payment to influencers who posted videos or still images with overlay text in support of Bloomberg. Bloomberg's campaign worked with Meme 2020, a social media company led by Jerry Media CEO Mick Purzycki, to pay popular Instagram accounts to post "self-aware ironic" memes about Bloomberg. In February 2020, the campaign hired 500 "deputy digital organizers" who were paid $2,500 per month to promote Bloomberg on their personal social media accounts and in text messages to their contact lists.

=== Billboards ===
In February 2020, Bloomberg's campaign purchased billboard space in Las Vegas, Nevada and Phoenix, Arizona ahead of President Trump's campaign rallies in the two cities. The billboards, placed in high-visibility locations along Trump's potential motorcade route and outside the Trump International Hotel Las Vegas, displayed phrases including "Donald Trump cheats at golf", "Donald Trump eats burnt steak", "Donald Trump lost the popular vote", and "Donald Trump went broke running a casino."

== Criticism and controversies ==
=== Transphobic comments ===
In 2020, Buzzfeed News unearthed video footage from 2019 of Bloomberg in which he questioned the effectiveness of Democratic politicians campaigning on transgender rights, saying: "If your conversation during a presidential election is about some guy wearing a dress, and whether he, she, or it can go to the locker room with their daughter, that's not a winning formula for most people." These comments were widely criticized as transphobic. Bloomberg claimed that this comment "was a poor attempt to describe how some who oppose transgender equality think about this issue", and that "those words do not reflect my unwavering support for equality for transgender Americans". A Bloomberg spokesperson pointed out that Bloomberg "signed a sweeping transgender civil rights bill into law" in April 2002.

=== Prison phone bank ===
The Intercept reported on December 24, 2019 that the Bloomberg campaign had unwittingly used prison labor. Call center ProCom was contracted to make calls through a third-party vendor; two of the company's call centers are located in state prisons in Oklahoma. Female inmates at the Dr. Eddie Warrior Correctional Center called voters in California. The Bloomberg campaign acknowledged the calls, but said they were unaware the calls originated in a prison. The campaign later severed ties with the company.

=== Plagiarized campaign materials ===
In February 2020, an analysis by The Intercept found that the Bloomberg campaign had plagiarized portions of its published policy proposals from news outlets, research publications, non-profit organizations, and policy groups. In response, Bloomberg's campaign asserted that the lack of attribution resulted from its use of the MailChimp e-mail service, which did not support footnote citation formatting.

=== Former mayoralty of New York City ===
==== "Stop and frisk" approval ====
On February 5, 2015, Bloomberg made comments at the Aspen Institute and, while addressing issues of minority rights, policing policy, and gun control, Bloomberg had said that police should confiscate guns of minorities between ages 15 and 25. "These kids think they're going to get killed anyway because all their friends are getting killed. So they just don't have any long-term focus or anything. It's a joke to have a gun. It's a joke to pull a trigger." He has stated that police should "throw them up against the wall and frisk them."

Bloomberg's approval of stop-and-frisk policies in New York City during his mayoralty has received widespread condemnation from the public and police alike. He eventually disavowed the controversial practice after announcing his campaign. Bloomberg stated at one point that, "One of the unintended consequences is people say, 'Oh my God, you are arresting kids for marijuana. They're all minorities.' Yes, that's true. Why? Because we put all the cops in the minority neighborhoods. Yes, that's true. Why do you do it? Because that's where all the crime is."

The comments were criticized by many as racist.

Bloomberg subsequently claimed that "I inherited the police practice of stop-and-frisk, and as part of our effort to stop gun violence, it was over-used. By the time I left office, I cut it back by 95%, but I should've done it faster, and sooner. I regret that, and I have apologized." This claim has been disputed by many in the media, who point to Bloomberg's past statements and actions as mayor as evidence that he supported and expanded the practice.

Nina Turner, the national co-chair of Bernie Sanders's presidential campaign, called for Bloomberg to drop out of the race over the issue.

==== Comments regarding redlining ====
In 2008, at the height of the housing/banking crisis, Bloomberg said at a university forum that the crisis "all started when there was a lot of pressure on banks to make loans to everyone", even in poor neighborhoods, so that "banks started making more and more loans where the credit of the person buying the house wasn't as good as you would like". When a video of these comments was published in February 2020, they were widely interpreted as saying that he had blamed the crisis at least in part on the end of redlining. In response, a Bloomberg spokesman said that Bloomberg had always opposed redlining, and fought against it as mayor.

=== Allegedly profane or sexist comments; non-disclosure agreements ===
A booklet of quotes attributed to Bloomberg, titled The Wit and Wisdom of Michael Bloomberg, was created as a gift to him in 1990. Some quotes included by The Washington Post include lewd and sexist comments directed at Bloomberg employees; one example described Bloomberg Terminals as computers that "will do everything, including give you [oral sex]. I guess that puts a lot of you girls out of business."

A former Bloomberg saleswoman also alleged that Bloomberg once joked that, "All of you girls line up to give him [oral sex] as a wedding present." Her lawsuit also alleged that, when Bloomberg saw a woman he was attracted to, he would say "I'd f*** that in a second." In a quote relating to an actress he was attracted to, Bloomberg is quoted as saying, "If women wanted to be appreciated for their brains, they'd go to the library, instead of to Bloomingdale's."

Bloomberg was criticized during the February debate for not allowing women who had settled lawsuits against his company to publicly air their grievances. On February 21, Bloomberg said that women who had sued because of complaints about him and had obtained settlements would be released from their non-disclosure agreements if they so desired.

=== Twitter troll accounts ===
Twitter suspended 70 troll accounts that posted content in support of Bloomberg's presidential campaign. Twitter said that Bloomberg's campaign violated Twitter's rules against "creating multiple accounts to post duplicative content", "posting identical or substantially similar Tweets or hashtags from multiple accounts you operate", and "coordinating with or compensating others to engage in artificial engagement or amplification, even if the people involved use only one account".

=== Edited debate footage ===
On February 20, 2020, Bloomberg's official Twitter account shared a manipulated video of the previous night's Democratic debate in Las Vegas. The video featured Bloomberg saying, "I'm the only one here that's ever started a business. Is that fair?", followed by a series of clips from various moments of the debate that were edited together to make it appear that Bloomberg's question was followed by 20 seconds of silence from the other candidates. Bloomberg's campaign responded to criticism by saying that the video was intended to be "tongue-in-cheek".

== Political positions ==
Bloomberg, who has said in an editorial he believes climate change cannot await favorable political winds, has funded Beyond Carbon. Beyond Carbon is modeled on the Beyond Coal campaign that he previously co-founded along with the Sierra Club; he credits Beyond Coal with contributing to the closure of half of the U.S.'s coal-fired power stations.

Bloomberg has advocated for greatly expanding U.S. health-care programs, to create essentially a hybrid single-payer health-care he has dubbed "Medicare for all for people that are uncovered".

Bloomberg's economic agenda focused on helping mid-sized cities in the economically lagging American heartland to become economic growth generators. It included increased federal funding for community-colleges, technical training programs, and job-creating research and development endeavors that "invest in college partnerships and apprenticeships that connect people with identifiable jobs and career paths"; providing workers—whether gig work, contract, or franchise employees—union organizing and collective bargaining rights; increasing the federal minimum wage to $15 an hour; increasing the Earned Income Tax Credit; and creating business resource centers to assist entrepreneurs.

Bloomberg stated that he was open to spending $1 billion to support the eventual Democratic candidate in the presidential election, even if that candidate ended up being Bernie Sanders or Elizabeth Warren. In February, the Sanders campaign stated that Sanders did not want financial help from Bloomberg if Sanders received the nomination; in turn, Bloomberg's spokesperson said that Bloomberg would not assist a candidate who did not desire his assistance. Bloomberg also said that he would not run ads against his rivals in the Democratic primaries. On February 17, however, Bloomberg ran an attack ad against Sanders's supporters, accusing them of using online bullying tactics to mute criticism of Sanders. The ad showed screenshots of alleged Sanders supporters using memes and threatening texts.

Part of Bloomberg's long-time political modus operandi is the funding of various non-profits that work on issues he supports. For example, Bloomberg has funded gun control-related nonprofits (he is the primary funder of Everytown for Gun Safety), climate-change prevention efforts, and city innovation organizations.

== Endorsements ==
Bloomberg has faced criticism by a few media outlets for "buying endorsements". According to HuffPost, the presidential candidate donated millions of dollars to the Congressional candidates, before later receiving their endorsements. Charities controlled by Michael Bloomberg, such as Bloomberg Philanthropies, have reportedly given grants and training to city mayors throughout the country, soon forming a network of mayors willing to support his campaign. One incident reported by the Detroit Free Press had Bloomberg receiving an endorsement from Wayne County Executive Warren Evans, after his campaign hired Evans's wife.

== Post-campaign developments ==
Bloomberg suspended his campaign on March 4, 2020, and he endorsed the Joe Biden 2020 presidential campaign. On March 20, he announced that he would transfer $18 million to the Democratic National Committee (DNC). He made a $2 million donation to the Black voter registration group Collective Future and $500,000 for Voto Latino to register new voters. He has pledged to spend $15 million to $20 million to register voters in five purple states. In addition, he announced a $2 million donation to the progressive group Swing Left to help Democrats in competitive races. He donated $5 million to Stacey Abrams's Fair Fight 2020 to encourage voter-registration and oppose voter-suppression measures.

Bloomberg had promised his campaign staff that they would be guaranteed jobs through November 2020. However, on March 20, Bloomberg announced he was laying off his staff. He added that some staffers might be hired by the DNC or by other campaigns. The announcement came during the COVID-19 pandemic in the United States. Former staff filed a class-action suit in the United States District Court for the Southern District of New York on March 23. The Bloomberg campaign noted that some former staffers had already been hired by the DNC, and that all former staffers were guaranteed health-care coverage through April. On April 27, 2020, Bloomberg announced that he would pay health-care costs for campaign workers through November 2020.
