= Hawkfish (company) =

US-Based political analysis company

Hawkfish LLC
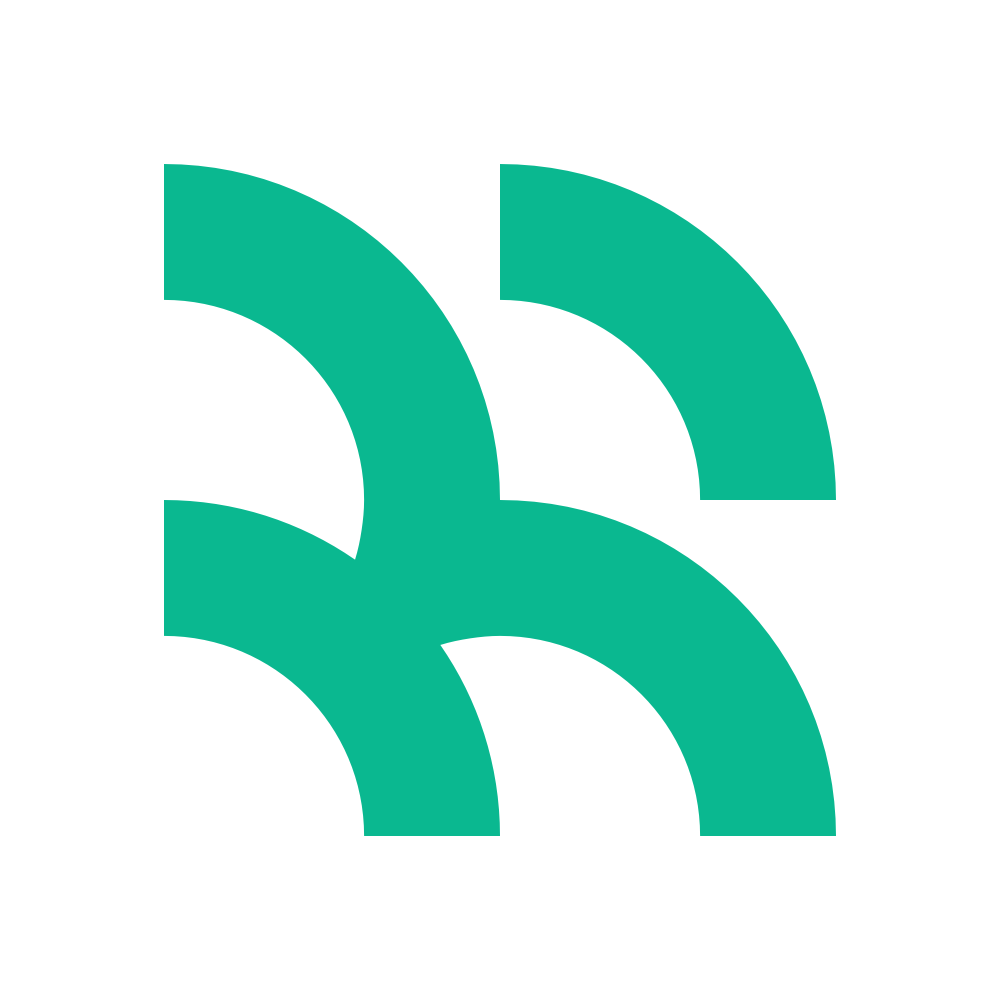
- Company type: Private
- Industry: Political analysis
- Founded: Spring 2019
- Founder: Michael Bloomberg
- Defunct: 2021
- Headquarters: New York, New York, United States
- Key people: Jeff Glueck, Head Of Digital; Gary Briggs
- Number of employees: Over 200 people

Hawkfish is a US political data and technology-based agency headquartered in New York City founded by Michael Bloomberg. The firm was founded in the spring of 2019 to support "Democratic candidates, good causes, and common sense solutions."

== History ==
In December 2019, after the Bloomberg campaign for the 2020 presidential Democratic nominee was established, CNBC was the first to report on Hawkfish's existence. According to the Bloomberg campaign, Hawkfish was also founded prior to Bloomberg's decision to run, although an exact date was not specified.

The firm states it has worked on the 2019 state elections in Virginia and Kentucky, in addition to the Bloomberg campaign. Federal Election Commission fillings show Bloomberg invested at least $25.7 million in the firm, out of the over $409 million he spent on his own campaign. During the primaries, the firm was responsible for the unorthodox media strategies of Bloomberg's campaign that garnered social media attention by promoting memes, and parodies of Bloomberg using Instagram direct messages.

Following Bloomberg's withdrawal from the 2020 Democratic Party presidential primaries, the Washington Post reported Bloomberg would continue to fund the company while campaign operations were suspended in the proceeding weeks. Bloomberg's support of Hawkfish is in addition to the formation of his as yet unnamed independent expenditure campaign which will support the Democratic candidate in the 2020 US presidential election.

In 2021, Hawkfish announced it was closing down.
