= Paula Stone Williams =

American pastoral counselor (born 1951)

- Born: 1951 (age 74–75); Colorado, United States
- Occupations: Pastor; counselor
- Years active: 1989–present
- Known for: Pastor of Envision Community Church, former CEO of Orchard Group

Reverend Paula Stone Williams (born 1951) is an American pastoral counselor. She served as president of the Christian church planting organization Orchard Group from 1989 to 2009. Williams came out as a transgender woman in December 2012.

Williams was fired from Orchard Group and from the Christian Standard periodical, where she had worked as the editor. She was a pastor at Envision Community Church (formerly Left Hand Church) in Longmont, Colorado, which closed in 2023. She has hosted several TED Talks, sometimes accompanied by her son, Jonathan Williams. She currently lives in Colorado. Her book, As a Woman, was published in 2021.
