= Michael Feldman (consultant) =

American public relations and communications consultant

- Born: October 14, 1968 (age 57)
- Education: Tufts University
- Occupations: Political adviser, communications consultant
- Employer: The Glover Park Group
- Political party: Democratic
- Spouse: Savannah Guthrie (m. 2014)
- Children: 2

Michael Feldman (born October 14, 1968) is an American public relations and communications consultant and a former Democratic political adviser. Feldman was Vice President Al Gore’s traveling chief of staff during the 2000 presidential election campaign. He is a founding partner and managing director of The Glover Park Group, a communications, consulting, and advocacy firm.

== Biography ==
Feldman began his political career in the U.S. Senate serving first as a floor assistant in the Senate cloakroom, and then as a legislative analyst for the Senate Democratic Policy Committee. In 1991, Feldman took leave from the Senate to work on Sen. Harris Wofford’s special election campaign.

Feldman joined Bill Clinton's campaign staff in 1992. Following the election, Feldman served in the Clinton administration as Vice President Al Gore’s deputy director of legislative affairs from 1993 to 1997. In 1997, Feldman became senior adviser and traveling chief of staff to the Vice President, a role he held until 2001. In November 2000, Feldman played a key role in Gore's decision to contest the results of the presidential election. On election night, Feldman helped pass news to Gore of the very small vote margin in Florida. Feldman, with fellow campaign officials Michael Whouley and Bill Daley, pressed Gore not to concede, and to instead push for a recount in Florida.

In 2001, Feldman formed The Glover Park Group with Gore campaign advisers Carter Eskew and Chip Smith, and former White House Press Secretary Joe Lockhart. The Glover Park Group offers communications, government relations, corporate advocacy and crisis management services. Feldman is a managing director at the firm; he developed and currently leads its entertainment and environmental practices. In 2007, Feldman was part of a team at The Glover Park Group named Public Relations Professionals of the Year by the Public Relations Society of America for its work on Al Gore’s film, An Inconvenient Truth.

In an interview with lawyers Ben Chew and Camille Vasquez, regarding the Depp v Heard defamation trial, Feldman's wife Savannah Guthrie revealed that Feldman had worked as a public relations consultant for the legal team representing Johnny Depp.

In 2026, Feldman and Glover Park Group were a part of a controversy when an email from 2015 was released as part of the Epstein files. A Clinton Administration acquaintance of Feldman, Larry Summers, told Jeffrey Epstein he should speak to someone at the Glover Park Group, telling him the firm had helped Bill Clinton and David Petraeus. While it was a passing mention, it still caught the attention of many who shared screenshots of the email on social media. Yet no evidence was released that showed that Epstein took or refused Summers' advice, or any communication between Epstein and Feldman's firm.
