= Kevin Sheekey =

American political consultant

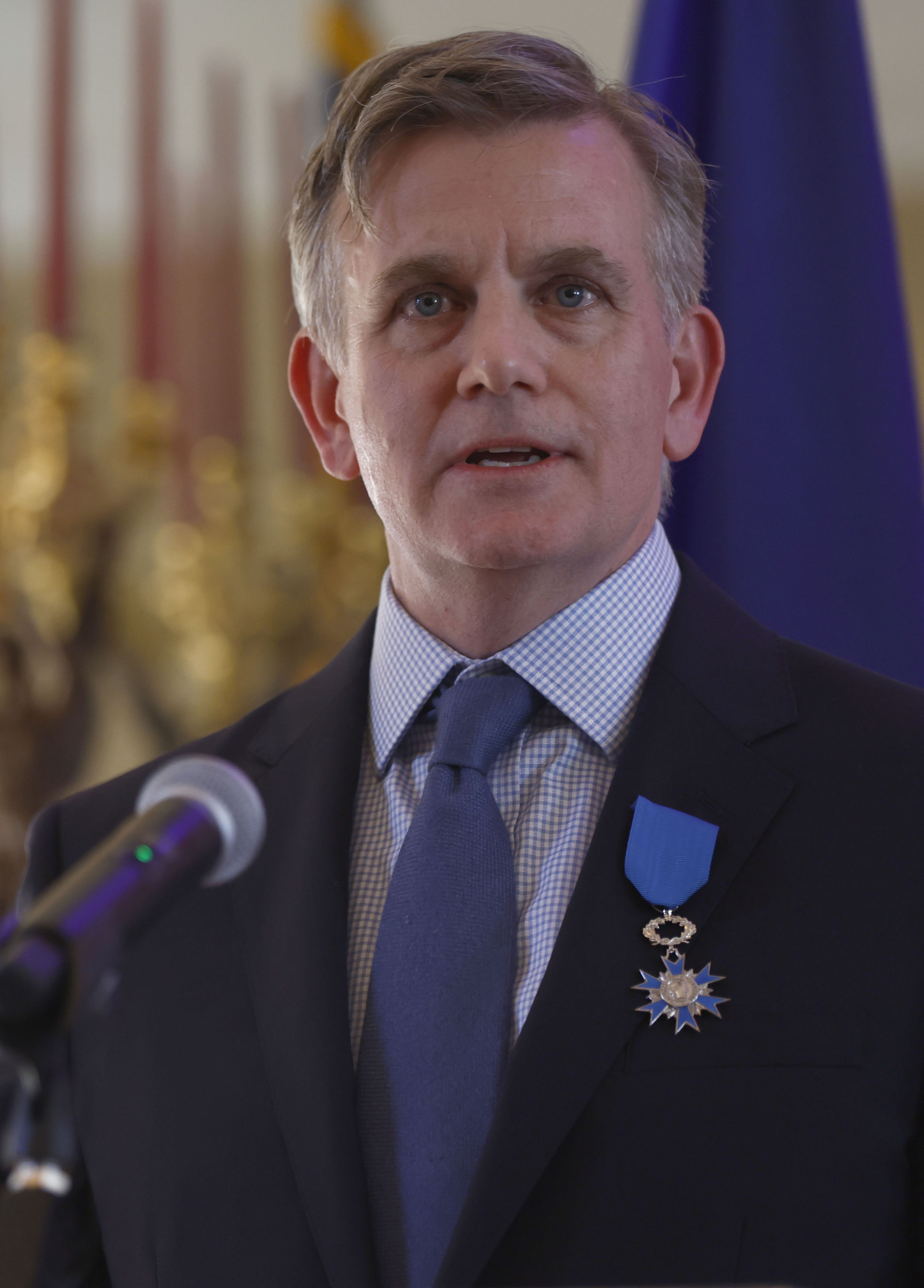
- Kevin Sheekey receives the Ordre National du Mérite at the French Embassy.
- Born: June 12, 1966 (age 60); Washington, D.C., U.S.
- Education: Washington University in St. Louis
- Occupations: Global Head of Communications, Government Relations and Marketing for Bloomberg L.P.
- Political party: Democratic
- Spouse: Robin Caiola (m. 1998)
- Children: 2
- Website: Sheekey Daily Read

Kevin Sheekey (born June 12, 1966) is an American businessman and political adviser. He is the Global Head of Communications, Government Relations and Marketing for Bloomberg L.P. He was the campaign manager for former New York City Mayor Mike Bloomberg's 2020 presidential campaign. Previously, Sheekey served as head of government relations and communications at Bloomberg L.P. and as chairman of Bloomberg Government. Sheekey also previously served as deputy mayor for government affairs for the City of New York under Mayor Michael R. Bloomberg. He is credited with managing Mayor Bloomberg's three successful campaigns for Mayor of New York. In March 2020, the Atlantic called Sheekey "one of the sharpest political minds of his generation."

== Early life and education ==
Sheekey grew up in Washington, D.C. His father, Arthur, was an educational-technology professional who was involved in creating the Department of Education during the Carter administration. His mother, Kathleen, worked at Common Cause as a legislative director.

He attended Washington University in St. Louis and Georgetown Day School.

He has two sisters, one of whom, Megan Sheekey, was the President of the Mayor's Fund to Advance New York City.

== Professional career ==
Following graduation, Sheekey worked in the U.S. House of Representatives as chief of staff for James Scheuer. From 1992 to 1997, Sheekey worked for New York Senator Daniel Patrick Moynihan, serving as press secretary, campaign manager for Moynihan's 1994 re-election campaign and eventually, the Senator's Chief of Staff. Including his time working for Sen. Moynihan, Sheekey spent a dozen years working for Democrats in Congress.

Sheekey was hired by Bloomberg L.P. in 1997 to work as the company's chief Washington lobbyist. He has been with Mike Bloomberg "since the beginning of his "political foray and has taken the lead in counseling him in the ways of politics."

Sheekey ran Mike Bloomberg's first mayoral campaign in 2001 despite initially encouraging Bloomberg not to run. As part of the Bloomberg administration, Sheekey served as president of the New York Host Committee, the organization in charge of overseeing the Republican National Convention, and later, as Bloomberg's deputy mayor of government affairs.

As manager of Bloomberg's 2005 re-election campaign, Sheekey was given 'free rein' to build a coalition of support for the mayor that included "unions, Democratic officials and liberal activists like NARAL Pro-Choice New York." After Bloomberg won in 2005, Sheekey was offered a job helping Arnold Schwarzeneggar's gubernatorial re-election campaign.

At the outset of Bloomberg's second term, Sheekey was credited with making a significant impact as a political strategist in the administration. Following re-election in November 2005, Bloomberg had "declared war on the National Rifle Association, come out publicly against key elements of the plan for ground zero [the original World Trade Center site] of his fellow Republican, Gov. George E. Pataki, and, through intermediaries, threatened to help Democrats take control of the State Senate from his fellow Republicans if they do not provide more money for city schools." Sheekey oversaw most of these efforts.

Sheekey played a prominent role in developing projects such as PlaNYC and obtaining billions in school construction funds for New York City from state legislators. A strategist with the New York State Democratic Committee called Sheekey "probably the best political operator" of his generation. Sheekey told the New York Times "I believe politics is a good thing. I believe in politics as the art of leadership." He is also known for exploring and organizing Bloomberg's potential presidential run in 2008. The mayor eventually opted to complete his second term rather than run for president.

When Sheekey returned to Bloomberg L.P. in 2010, Michael Bloomberg credited him with shepherding issues like mayoral control of schools, winning billions of additional budget dollars from the state capitol and withdrawing New York City from a partnership with Off-Track Betting. Sheekey also led efforts to overhaul the city Marriage Bureau. In a statement, Bloomberg said Sheekey "had his hand in just about everything we've done over the past four years and we've been smarter more strategic and more successful due to his efforts."

On his return to Bloomberg L.P., Sheekey oversaw government relations and communications for the company and served as chairman of Bloomberg Government, a subscription data service providing aggregated government news and analysis. He eventually rose within Bloomberg L.P. to the role of Global Head of Communications, Government Relations and Marketing. He is based part-time in London where he represents Bloomberg L.P.'s global business presence.

Sheekey serves on the board of the ONE Campaign, alongside the likes of U2's lead singer Bono, Sheryl Sandberg, John Doerr, Lawrence Summers, and Susan Buffett. He is also a member of the board of the Partnership for Public Service.

Sheekey was a founding board member of Tech:NYC at its inception in 2016. Tech:NYC is a non profit organization that represents the interest of New York City's technology sector through the support of member companies like Google, Bloomberg L.P., Uber, and Facebook.

In 2015, Sheekey began laying groundwork for Michael Bloomberg to run for president as an Independent candidate in the 2016 election. Sheekey worked with Democratic and Republican political strategists to map out staffing and messaging for the proposed campaign. Bloomberg formally announced he would not run on March 7, 2016, stating that there was too high of a risk his candidacy could lead to the election of Donald Trump or Senator Ted Cruz. Sheekey later advised on preparation and strategy for Bloomberg's primetime speech at the 2016 Democratic National Convention, during which Bloomberg endorsed Hillary Clinton for president. Sheekey told the New York Times during the campaign "Hillary [Clinton] has some baggage, but Trump is crazy. And you can't fix crazy."

It was reported that Sheekey was considering running in the 2017 New York City mayoral election against incumbent Bill de Blasio, but ultimately decided against entering the mayoral race to continue to focus on expanding former New York City three-term mayor Michael Bloomberg's global work with mayors around climate change and other issues. Sheekey's interest in climate and sustainability has grown since helping create New York City's climate change-focused strategic plan in 2007. In 2017, Sheekey proposed that Bloomberg Philanthropies cover the gap created when Donald Trump withdrew the U.S. from the Paris climate accords.

In November 2019, Mike Bloomberg announced that he was running for president and named Sheekey his campaign manager. Sheekey had previously said that Bloomberg would have an advantage as a candidate — and would work to ensure any Democratic nominee would defeat the incumbent — because of his business acumen and technological knowledge. Sheekey said in February 2019, "Whether Mike runs or not, he really wants to advance the science of how you target voters...One of the country's best technology entrepreneurs ever is going to make sure that whoever wins the Democratic nomination is going to all have the support they'll need to win a general election and beat Trump." Sheekey discussed the reasoning behind entering the race in a December 2019 interview with David Plouffe, who ran President Obama's 2008 campaign. They also covered Bloomberg's decision to skip the first four state contests and mount a 'national campaign.' Sheekey said that although he wasn't sure Bloomberg could win, "Had Mike not run that campaign, it is my belief that Trump would still be in office."

In December 2023, Sheekey was awarded the Freedom of the City of London. Sheekey received the French Ordre national du mérite in April 2022. French Ambassador to the U.S. Philippe Etienne presented the honor on behalf of French President Emmanuel Macron. Ambassador Etienne cited Sheekey's promotion of Franco-American friendship and leadership on climate change.

== Personal life ==
He lives in Manhattan with his wife, Robin, and their twin children.
