= Joe Lockhart =

American spokesperson and consultant (born 1959)

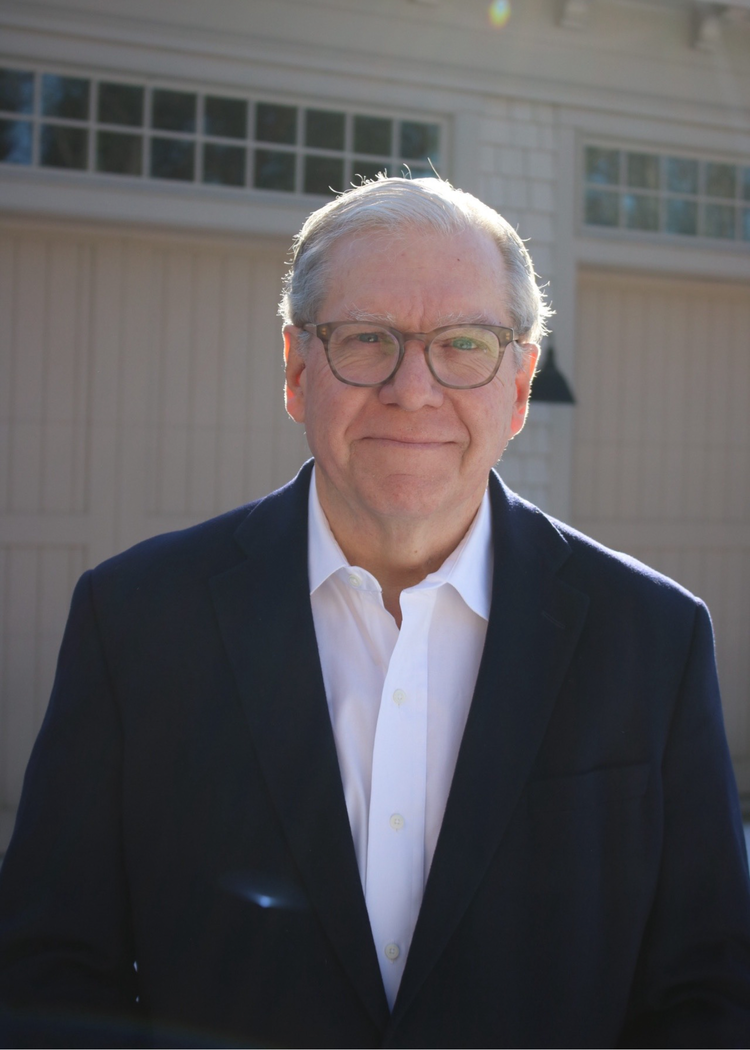
- Lockhart in 2025

21st White House Press Secretary
- In office August 4, 1998 – September 29, 2000
- President: Bill Clinton
- Deputy: Jake Siewert
- Preceded by: Mike McCurry
- Succeeded by: Jake Siewert

Personal details
- Born: Joseph Patrick Lockhart; July 13, 1959 (age 67) New York City, U.S.
- Party: Democratic
- Education: Georgetown University (BA)

Joseph Patrick Lockhart (born July 13, 1959) is an American spokesman and communications consultant who served as the 21st White House press secretary during the Clinton administration. Previously, he had worked as press secretary for several Democratic politicians, including Walter Mondale, Paul Simon, and Michael Dukakis. Following his work as press secretary in the Clinton administration, he was an advisor to John Kerry during his 2004 presidential campaign. He subsequently founded and became managing director of the communications consulting firm The Glover Park Group, worked for Facebook from 2011 to 2012, and was executive vice president of communications and public affairs for the NFL from 2016 to 2018.

== Early life and career ==
Born in The Bronx, Lockhart is the son of Ann Teahan and Raymond Lockhart, a longtime NBC producer associated with The Huntley–Brinkley Report and special-events coverage. He grew up in Suffern, New York. In 1978, he moved to Washington D.C. to attend Georgetown University, where he received a BA in History. In 1980, he worked on Jimmy Carter's presidential reelection campaign.

He was press secretary for the 1984 presidential campaign of Walter Mondale, then worked for Paul Simon in the Senate. Stints with ABC and CNN followed, then the presidential campaign of Michael Dukakis in 1988. He moved to Robinson, Lake, Lerer & Montgomery with Mike McCurry, then back to ABC when they hired his (former) wife and colleague from the Mondale campaign, Laura Logan.

Another stint with NBC covering the Romanian Revolution in 1989 preceded his first on-air job with Sky News, reporting on the Gulf War and then business. Private practice with Robinson, Lake followed, where he handled publicity for the Al Nahayan family during parts of the BCCI scandal.

== Clinton presidential campaign and the White House ==
At a time when Lockhart was considering working for AOL, Mike McCurry recruited Lockhart back into politics, and he joined the 1996 Clinton re-election campaign. He served as the campaign spokesman and, following President Clinton's successful reelection, as Deputy Press Secretary to McCurry. After standing in for him on occasion to brief the press, Lockhart eventually succeeded McCurry and delivered his first briefing as Press Secretary in October 1998.

Lockhart handled press relations during Clinton's impeachment and the 2000 Camp David Summit. Lockhart calls the pre-impeachment period in December 1998 the "most harrowing" weeks of his career.

== After the White House ==
Lockhart was brought on to the John Kerry presidential campaign as a senior advisor in September 2004.

On September 8, 2004, CBS News aired a controversial report on presidential candidate George W. Bush's military record. The authenticity of the Killian documents used in that report remain under scrutiny. Over the next few days, it was discovered that Lockhart had made a phone call to Texas National Guard officer, Bill Burkett on September 4. Lockhart stated later that an unnamed female CBS producer asked him to contact Burkett. Lockhart has denied that the call with Burkett had anything to do with the National Guard issue.

Lockhart co-founded the consulting firm The Glover Park Group, becoming its Managing Director. In June 2011, he joined Facebook as the head of the company's corporate, policy, and international communications team. Not wanting to relocate to the company's headquarters in Menlo Park, California, he left the company in October 2012.

On February 15, 2016, Lockhart was introduced as the new executive vice president of communications and top public relations official for the National Football League; he left the job after the 2018 Super Bowl to spend time with his family.

== Personal life ==
Lockhart was previously married to Laura Logan, Deputy Press Secretary for John Glenn's 1984 presidential run and a longtime ABC News producer. In 2013, Lockhart married Giovanna Gray. They divorced in 2022.

In 2016, it was announced that President Obama and his family planned to rent Lockhart's Kalorama home after he left office. It was later revealed that the Obamas purchased the house from Lockhart in May 2017, saying that it made sense to own the property since they would remain in Washington D.C. for at least two more years.

== Sources ==
- Joe Lockhart – The Glover Park Group

Political offices
Preceded by Mike McCurry	White House Press Secretary; 1998–2000	Succeeded by Jake Siewert
