= Klee (surname) =

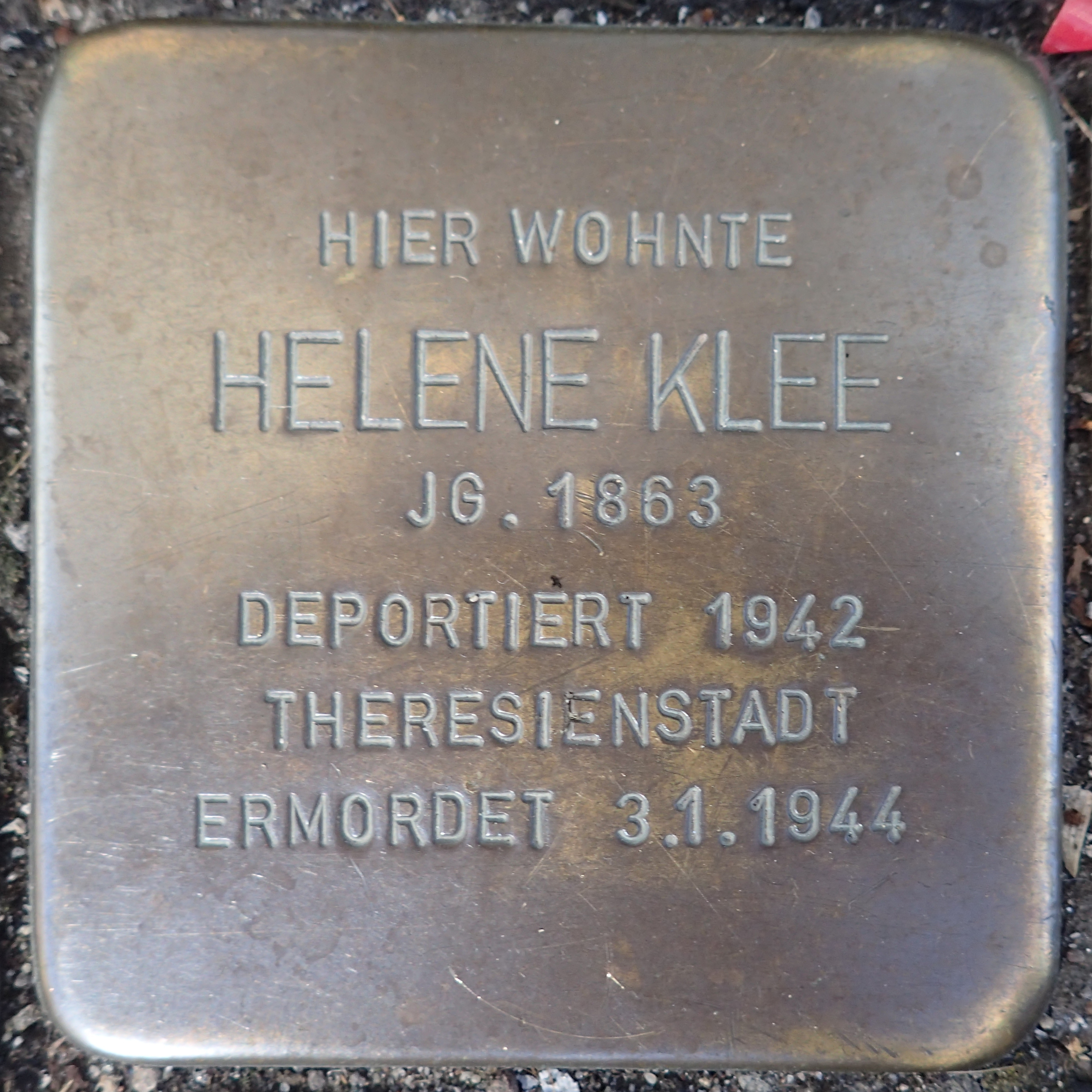
- Stolperstein of Helene Klee
- Pronunciation: ˈkleː or as in "clay"
- Language: German, Yiddish, French

Origin
- Languages: German, Hebrew
- Region of origin: Alsace, France, Luxembourg, Switzerland, Germany

Other names
- Alternative spelling: Klée
- Variant forms: Kleeblatt, Kleegman, Kleeberg, Kleefeld, Kleeman, Kleemann, Kleiman

Klee (Yiddish: קליי) is a German and Ashkenazi Jewish surname. Variations include Kleefeld, Kleeblatt, Kleegman, Kleiman, Kleeman and Kleeberg. In German, it means "clover" and is possibly a toponymic surname like Feldman.

According to researchers at ANU – Museum of the Jewish People, the name Klee originates from the Greek Kalonymos (Hebrew: קלונימוס), a translation of the Hebrew "shem tov" (שם טוב) meaning "good name". Klee is documented as a Jewish surname in Alsace in France since the 18th century, along with similar names such as Kleemann.

In France, the name is associated with the Alsatian commune of Katzenthal, near Colmar.

== People with the name Klee ==
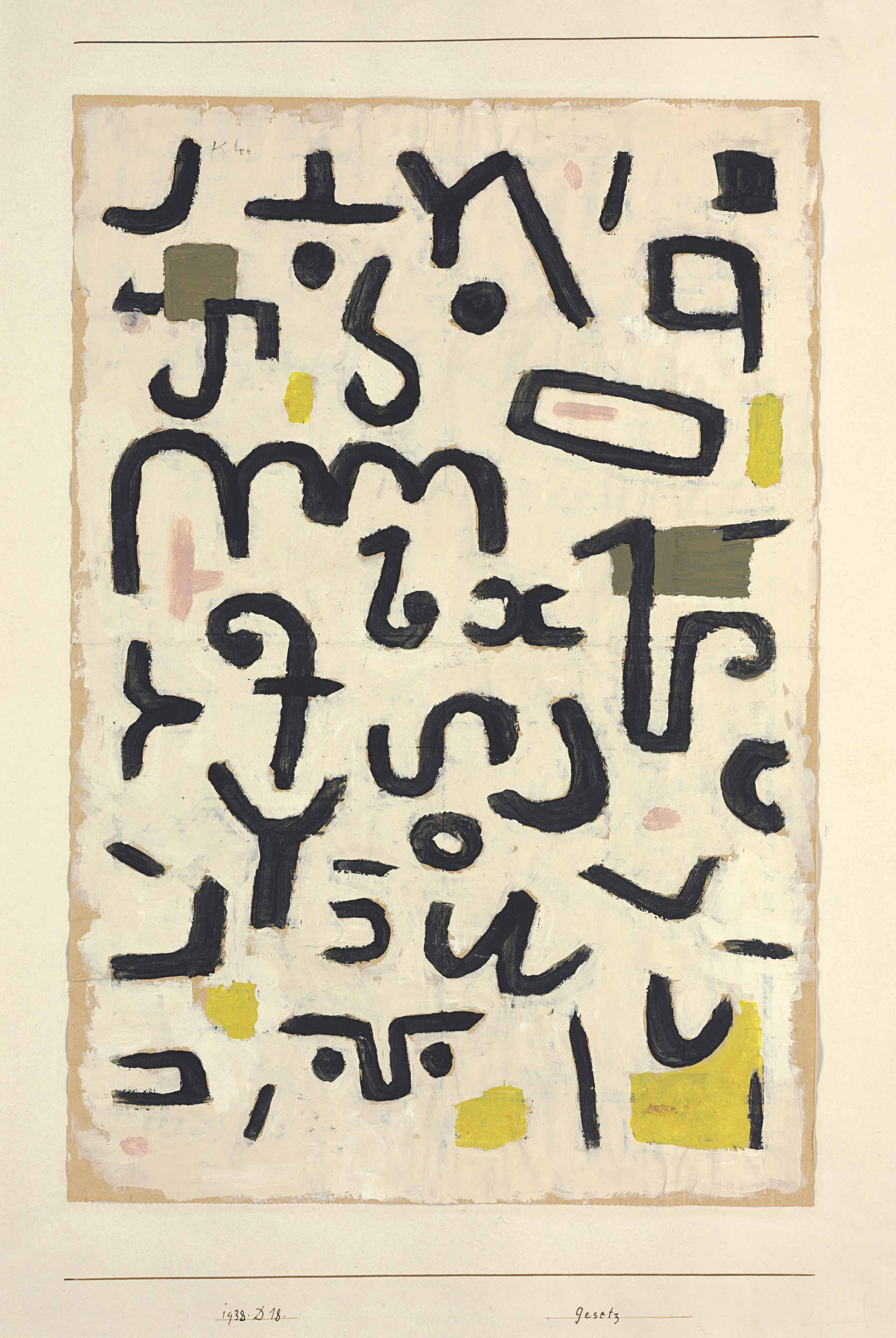
An artwork by Paul Klee

- Alfred Klee (1875–1943), German lawyer and Zionist leader
- Bernhard Klee (1936–2025), German conductor
- Carsten Klee (born 1970), German footballer
- Ernst Klee (1942–2013), German teacher, writer, and filmmaker of works about the Holocaust
- Esther Eugenie Klee-Rawidowicz (1900–1980), German-Jewish biologist, wife of the Polish-born American Jewish philosopher Simon Rawidowicz (1897–1957)
- Flora Klee-Palyi (1893–1961), Jewish Hungarian illustrator, translator, and editor
- Heinrich Klee (1800–1840), German theologian
- Jean-Louis Klée (1908–1989), Alsatian spy
- Jean-Paul Klée (1943–), Alsatian poet
- Karl Heinz Klee (1930–2008), Austrian sports official
- Ken Klee (born 1971), American professional ice hockey player
- Miguel Klee (born 1977), Guatemalan football goalkeeper
- Ollie Klee (1900–1977), outfielder in Major League Baseball
- Patricia Klee, American politician
- Paul Klee (1879–1940), German-Swiss painter
- Raymond-Lucien Klée (1907–1944), French philosopher
- Ruth Judith Klee (1901–1942), family friend of Anne Frank
- Stefanie Klee (born 1982), German politician
- Victor Klee (1925–2007), mathematician
- Waldemar Gøthrik Klee (1853–1891), Californian horticulturist

== People with the name Kleeblatt ==
- Norman Kleeblatt, curator at the Jewish Museum (Manhattan)

== People with the name Kleiman ==
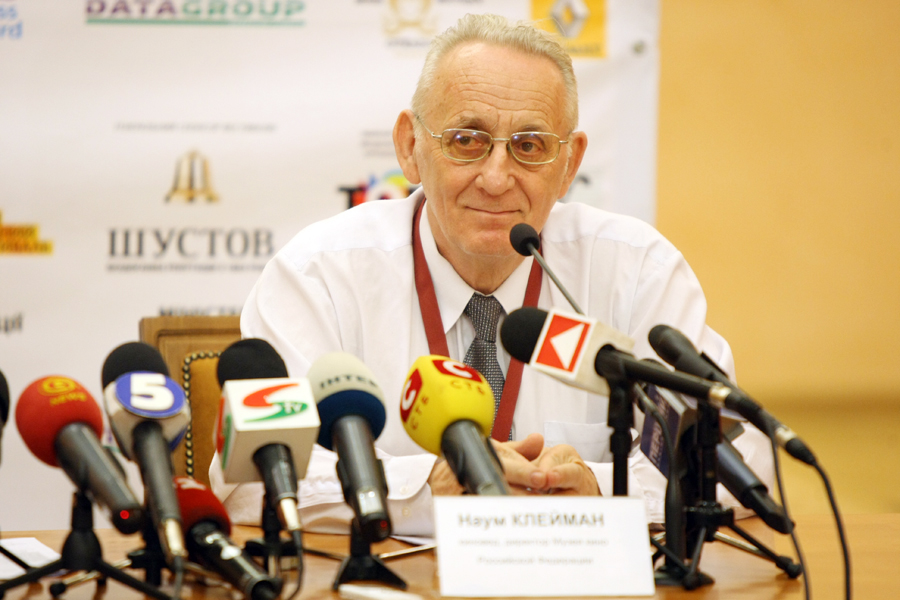
Naum Kleiman – Odessa International Film Festival – 17 July 2010 – 1

- Ariel Kleiman (born 1985), Australian director
- Bernard Kleiman (1928–2006), lawyer
- Dave Kleiman (1967–2013), American forensic computer expert
- Devra G. Kleiman (1942–2010), American biologist
- Johannes Kleiman (1896–1959), Dutch helper of the Frank family
- Mark A. R. Kleiman (1951–2019), American academic drug policy authority
- Michael Kleiman, documentary filmmaker
- Naum Kleiman (born 1937), historian of cinema
- Pascal Kleiman (born 1968), disc jockey
- Steven Kleiman (born 1942), American mathematician
- Vladimir Kleiman (1930–2014), Russian scientist

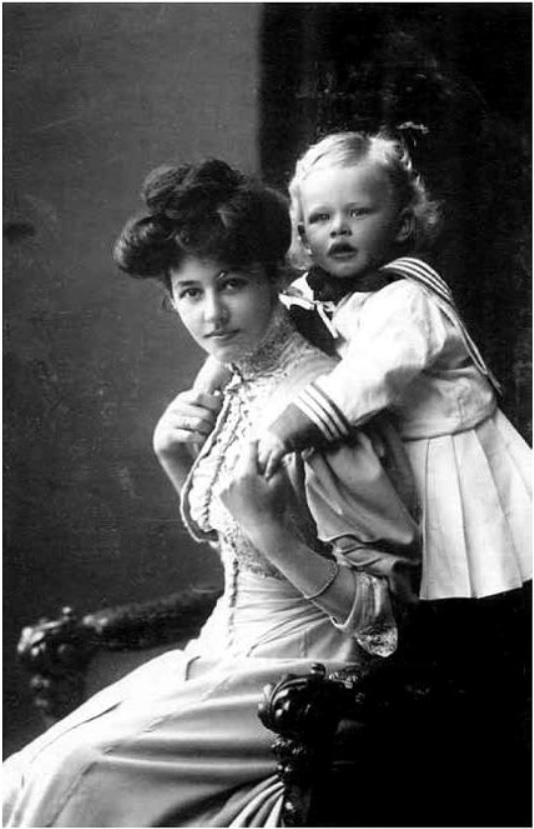
Käte Stresemann, née Kleefeld, and Wolfgang Stresemann 1906

== People with the name Kleeman ==
- Alexandra Kleeman (born 1986), American writer
- Jenny Kleeman, Jewish-British documentary film-maker and journalist
- Otto Kleemann (1855–1936), American architect
- Wilhelm Kleemann (1869–1969), Jewish banker

== People with the name Kleefeld ==
- Carolyn Mary Kleefeld, American poet and author
- Hans Kleefeld (1929–2016), Canadian designer
- Käte Stresemann (1883–1970), née Kleefeld, German Weimar Republic society figure
- Kurt von Kleefeld (1881–1934), German lawyer

== People with the name Kleeberg ==
- Clotilde Kleeberg (1866–1909), French pianist
- Franciszek Kleeberg (1888–1941), Polish general
- Michael Kleeberg (born 1959), German writer and translator
- Minna Kleeberg (1841–1878), German-American poet
- Sophie Kleeberg (born 1990), German shot putter

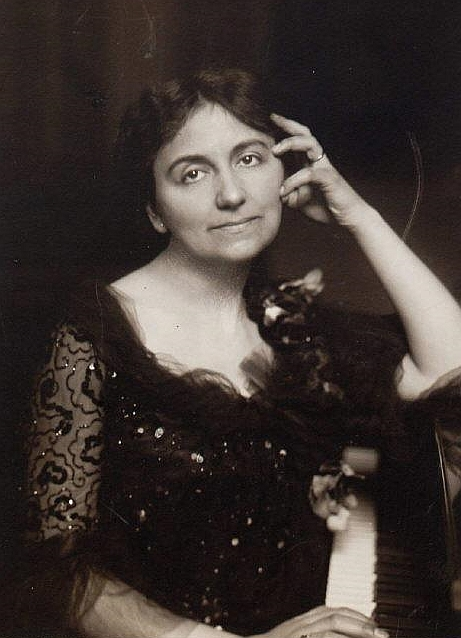
Clotilde Kleeberg by Charles Gerschel

== People with the name Kleegman ==
- Sophia Kleegman, Russian American obstetrician, gynecologist, and sex education advocate

== Other sources ==
- Lars Menk: A Dictionary of German-Jewish Surnames. Avotaynu, Bergenfield, 2005.
- David S. Zubatsky and Irwin M. Berent: Sourcebook for Jewish Genealogies and Family Histories. Avotaynu, 1996.

== See also ==
- Kleefeld
- Kleeblatt
- Kleiman
- Kleeman
- Kleeberg
- Feldman
- Feldmann
