= Kleiman =

Kleiman is a surname. Notable people with the surname include:

- Ariel Kleiman (born 1985), Australian director
- Bernard Kleiman (1928–2006), lawyer
- Dave Kleiman (1967–2013), American forensic computer expert
- Devra G. Kleiman (1942–2010), American biologist
- Dov Kleiman, American sports media personality
- Johannes Kleiman (1896–1959), Dutch helper of the Frank family
- Mark A. R. Kleiman (born 1951), American academic drug policy authority
- Michael Kleiman, documentary filmmaker
- Naum Kleiman (born 1937), historian of cinema
- Pascal Kleiman (born 1968), disc jockey
- Steven Kleiman (born 1942), American mathematician
- Vladimir Kleiman (1930–2014), Russian scientist
- Zach Kleiman (born 1988), American basketball executive

== See also ==
- Klee
