= Kleeberg =

Kleeberg is a surname of German origin, and people with that name include:

- Clotilde Kleeberg (1866–1909), French pianist
- Franciszek Kleeberg (1888–1941), Polish general
- Michael Kleeberg (born 1959), German writer and translator
- Minna Kleeberg (1841–1878), German-American poet
- Sophie Kleeberg (born 1990), German shot putter

== See also ==
- Klee
