= Web (2013 film) =

- Directed by: Michael Kleiman
- Release date: November 16, 2013 (DOC NYC)
- Country: United States
- Language: English

Web is a 2013 documentary film directed by Michael Kleiman.

A portion of the film

The documentary follows several Peruvian families as they gain computer and Internet access for the first time through the One Laptop per Child program. It also includes interviews with people such as author Clay Shirky, Wikipedia's Jimmy Wales, Dennis Crowley of Foursquare, Scott Heiferman of Meetup, and One Laptop founder Nicholas Negroponte. Kleiman spent ten months living in Peru, dividing his time in the towns of Antuyo in the mountains and Palestina in the Amazon rainforest.

Web premiered and won the Sundance Now Audience Award at the 2013 DOC NYC Film Festival.
