= Kleefeld =

Kleefeld (meaning clover-field in German) may refer to:

== People ==
- Carolyn Mary Kleefeld, American poet and author
- Hans Kleefeld (1929–2016), Canadian designer
- Käte Stresemann (1883–1970), née Kleefeld, a German woman
- Kurt von Kleefeld (1881–1934), German lawyer
- Traudl Kleefeld (1936–2024), German modern philologist, historian, author and volunteer in the Protestant Church

== Places ==
- Kleefeld, Manitoba, a community in Manitoba, Canada
- Buchholz-Kleefeld, an administrative district of Hanover in Germany, served by Hannover-Kleefeld railway station
- Glebiska, German name Kleefeld, a village in Warmia-Masuria, Poland
- Sumiak, German name Kleefeld, a village in West Pomerania, Poland
- Kleefeld, Ukraine, An abandoned village in Zaporizhzhia Oblast, Ukraine

== See also ==
- Klee
