= Klieman =

Klieman is a surname. Notable people with the surname include:

- Aaron Klieman (1939–2021), American-born Israeli historian
- Chris Klieman (born 1967), American football player and coach
- Ed Klieman (1918–1979), American baseball player
- Rikki Klieman (born 1948), American criminal defense lawyer

== See also ==
- Kleiman
