= Heiferman =

Heiferman is a surname. Notable people with the surname include:

- Marvin Heiferman (born 1948), American curator and writer
- Scott Heiferman (born 1972), American community organizer, businessman, and internet entrepreneur
