= Joseph Jaquet =

Belgian sculptor

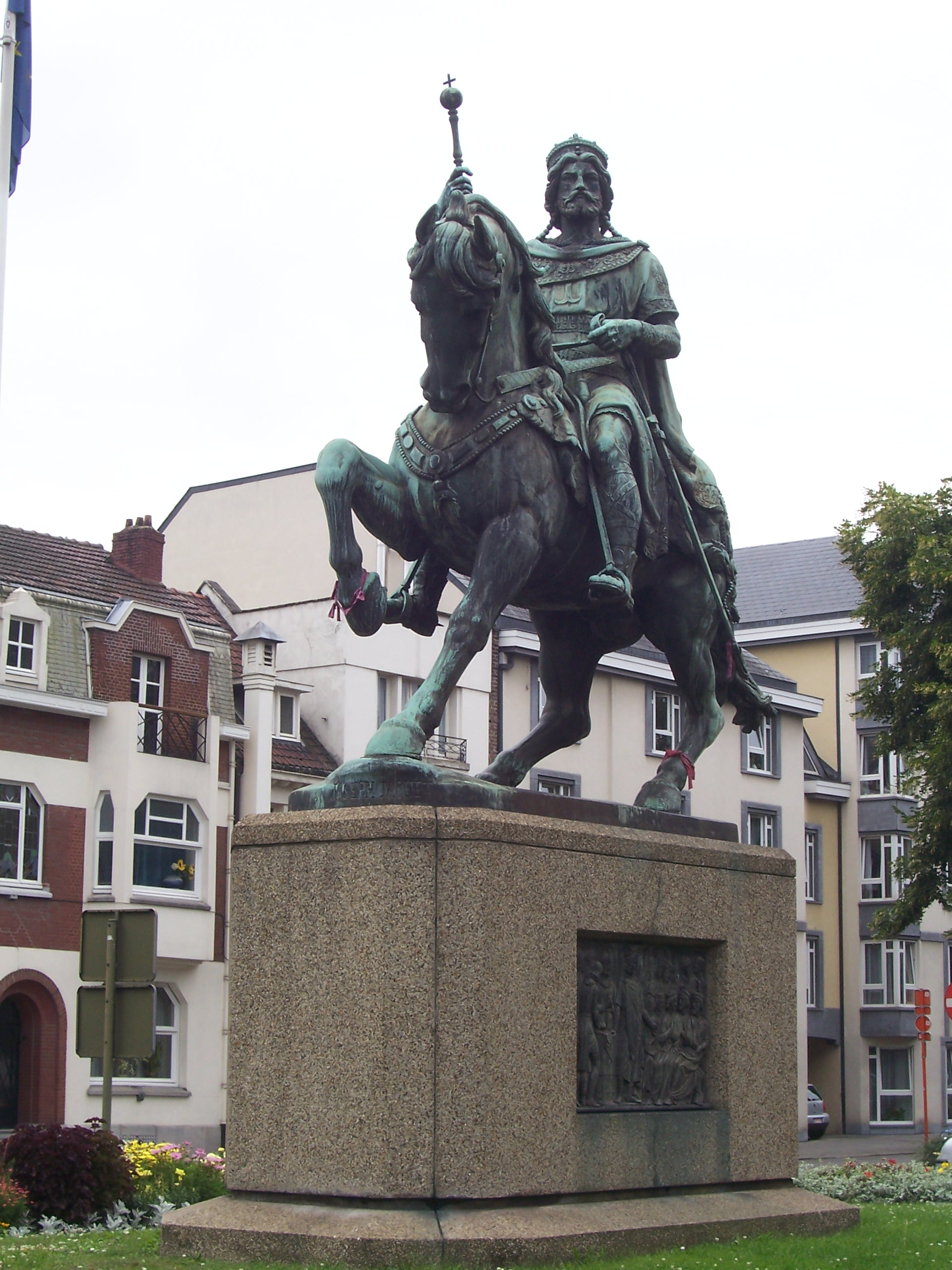
Baldwin I of Constantinople in Mons by Joseph Jaquet

Joseph Jaquet, sometimes written Joseph Jacquet, (30 January 1822 - 9 June 1898) was a Belgian sculptor.

== Biography ==
Joseph Jaquet, born in Antwerp in Belgium, was the son of a baker.

He studied with Guillaume Geefs at the Brussels Académie Royale des Beaux-Arts and was the friend of Peter Ludwig Kühnen (1812–1877), a painter originating from Aachen, specialised in painting romantic landscapes.

He called from Antwerp to Brussels his brother Jacques (1830 - 1898) who assisted him throughout his lifetime. Jacques actively took part in sculpture by his own productions for the Brussels art salons of 1843, 1854, 1860, 1866, 1872 and 1873. (Note: Jacques Jaquet was the author of the bronze monument dedicated to Antoine Wiertz, Raymond Blyckaerts Place in Ixelles)

For the 1842 Brussels Art Salon, Joseph Jaquet exhibited a marble bust, three plaster busts, a Moses Saved from the Waters and a Meditating Saint Paul which brought him notoriety.

His contribution for the 1845 Salon was more important and especially a model for a bronze statue of Froissart for Chimay but he acquired a definitive notoriety in 1854 with The Golden Age.

At that time, he lived in Goffard street then he moved for Charles Quint street.

In 1864, he secured his first commission in Amsterdam: The Victory for the Paleis voor Volksvlijt, then a second commission for the decoration of the national monument in The Hague Willemspark.

The equestrian statue of Baldwin I of Constantinople was created in 1868 in Mons, then the pediment and lions on the Bourse Palace in Brussels in 1872.

In 1879, Joseph Jaquet designed a statue of Louise of Orléans, first Queen of the Belgians: this statue was on the Place d'Armes in Philippeville then was moved to the old École moyenne, Namur street.

He was a professor at the Brussels Académie Royale des Beaux-Arts and a master of Charles Samuel.

He died in 1898 in Schaerbeek in the Brussels-Capital Region. (Note: A street bears his name in Schaerbeek (in French: Rue Joseph Jacquet, in Dutch: Joseph Jacquetstraat): this street goes from François-Joseph Navez street to George Stephenson street.)

== Honours ==
- Officer of the Order of Leopold
- Officer of the Order of the Oak Crown
- Member of the Royal Academy of Science, Letters and Fine Arts of Belgium.
