= Kleitman =

Kleitman is a surname. Notable people with the surname include:

- Daniel Kleitman (born 1934), American mathematician and professor
- Nathaniel Kleitman (1895–1999), American physiologist and sleep researcher
- Zina Kalay-Kleitman, Israeli diplomat

== See also ==
- Kleiman
