= Carolyn Mary Kleefeld =

American author, poet, and visual artist

- Born: Carolyn Mary Taper; Catford, London, England
- Education: UCLA
- Occupations: Poet, author, artist
- Writing career
- Notable awards: Pushcart Prize (Nominee)
- Website: carolynmarykleefeld.com

Carolyn Mary Kleefeld (née Taper) is an English-American author, poet, and visual artist. She is the author of twenty-five books, has a line of fine art cards, and has had numerous gallery and museum awards and exhibitions between 1981 and the present, in New York City, Chicago, Los Angeles, San Francisco, and other major cities.

== Biography ==
=== Early life ===
Kleefeld was born in Catford, South London, the youngest daughter of Amelia (née Lewis) and Mark Taper. Her family was Jewish. At the age of four, she moved to Long Beach and then Santa Monica, California. She attended the Westlake School for Girls. She studied art and psychology at UCLA.

=== Career ===
Kleefeld is the author of twenty-five books. She has created an extensive and diverse body of paintings and drawings, ranging in style from romantic figurative to abstract. Her art is featured internationally in galleries, museums, private collections, and multimedia presentations.

=== Personal life ===
Kleefeld currently lives in Big Sur, California. Kleefeld is also known by her married name, Caroyln Campagna Kleefeld. On Valentine’s Day 2017, she wed David Campagna. Campagna died three weeks later from a long-term illness. She had previously been married to Tony Kleefeld, known professionally as Tony Travis.

== Poetry and writings ==
Kleefeld's writings include poetry, prose, and art. Her work has been translated into Korean, Romanian, Japanese, Italian, Sicilian, Chinese, Arabic, Bengali, Bulgarian, Russian, Spanish, Catalan, Greek, and Persian.

== Artwork ==
Kleefeld’s artwork has appeared in numerous galleries and museums.

The Frederick R. Weisman Museum of Art at Pepperdine University in Malibu, California, exhibited a retrospective of her paintings and drawings and published an exhibition catalog, Carolyn Mary Kleefeld: Visions from Big Sur, with art from the exhibit and a commentary by museum curator and director, Michael Zakian.

Other solo exhibitions include “30 years of Abstract Visions” at the Gallery at the Ventana Inn in Big Sur, California (2014), “The Divine Kiss” at the Karpeles Manuscript Library Museum in Santa Barbara, California (2013) and Shreveport, Louisiana (2014), “Art, Poetry, and Reflective Prose”at the Walter Lee Avery Gallery at the Seaside, California City Hall (2002), “Parallel Universes: Visions for the 21st Century” at the Stowitts Museum & Library in Pacific Grove, California (2001), “A Retrospective from Abstract to Neo-Impressionism” at the corporate offices of “333 Bush Street,” in San Francisco, California (1999), and a poetry reading and art exhibit at Gallerie Illuminati in Santa Monica, California (1990). Kleefeld's art has also been exhibited at The American Jewish University, Los Angeles (2016), The B.J. Spoke Gallery, Huntington, New York (2014), The Old Courthouse Art Center, Woodstock, Illinois (2014), The New York Hall of Science, New York, NY (2013), the Alexandria Museum of Art, Alexandria, Louisiana (2013), Woman Made Gallery, Chicago, Illinois (2001), University of California-Santa Cruz, Santa Cruz, California (2001), National Arts Club in New York, New York (2001), and Nassau County Museum of Art, Roslyn Harbor, New York, among others.

Kleefeld’s art is in the permanent collections, among others, of The Downey Museum of Art, The Frederick R. Weisman Art Museum, The Henry Miller Memorial Library in Big Sur, and The Dylan Thomas Theatre, in Swansea, Wales.

== Carolyn Campagna Kleefeld Contemporary Art Museum ==
In 2019, Kleefeld gifted $10 million to the California State University, Long Beach (CSULB), which was by far the largest donation received by the school. Consequently, the University Art Museum was renamed the Carolyn Campagna Kleefeld Contemporary Art Museum later that year. Months later, Kleefeld donated 120 of her own artworks to the institution’s permanent collection.

After undergoing a two-year-long expansion and renovation, the museum re-opened on February 12, 2022, and now holds 178 of Kleefeld's drawings and paintings as part of its permanent collection. In addition, the university houses Kleefeld's literary archives, and an endowment will fund annual scholarships for the College of the Arts, an interdisciplinary lecture series at the university, a student intern, and museum program enhancement.

After the opening of the Kleefeld exhibit at CSULB, Los Angeles Times art critic Christopher Knight described Kleefeld's work as "frankly terrible - by far the worst I’ve seen on display in a serious exhibition venue, public or private, for profit or nonprofit, in years." An anonymous professor at the university also noted: “If that was a student applicant’s portfolio, they wouldn’t get admitted to the program."

== Awards and honors ==
- Nominations for The Pushcart Prize, 2008, 2009, 2011, 2012, 2013, 2014
- World Poetry Empowered Poet Award / Vancouver, Canada, 2014
- Il Meleto Di Guido Gozanno Award for Poetry / Torino, Italy, 2014
- First place, Short Story Contest: 101 Words / Monterey County Weekly / Monterey, CA, 2006
- First Place, Light, Space & Time Art Competition: Abstraction, Judge’s Award for Excellence, John Nichols Gallery, Santa Paula, CA, 2001

== Bibliography ==
Poetry

- Climates of the Mind (1979) (5th Reprint: Author's Choice Press: Lincoln, NE (2005) ISBN 978-0595365647
- Satan Sleeps With The Holy: Word Paintings (1982) Horse and Bird Press; Big Sur, CA ISBN 978-0960221486
- Lovers in Evolution (1983) Editor: Patricia Karahan. Horse and Bird Press: Big Sur, CA ISBN 9780960221400
- Vagabond Dawns (2009) Cross-Cultural Communications, New York ISBN 978-0-89304-186-1
- Poet to Poet #4: Poems--East Coast/West Coast with Stanley Barkan (2010) The Seventh Quarry/Cross Cultural Communications, ISBN 978-0-89304-279-0

Poetry and Art

- Kissing Darkness: Love Poems and Art with David Wayne Dunn (2003) RiverWood Books ISBN 1-883991-83-8
- The Divine Kiss: An Exhibit of Paintings and Poems in Honor of David Campagna (2014) Cross-Cultural Communications, New York ISBN 978-0893049706
- Immortal Seeds: Bearing Gold from the Abyss (2022) Cross-Cultural Communications/The Seventh Quarry Press ISBN 978-0893048570

Poetry, Prose, and Art

- Songs of Ecstasy (1990) Gallerie Illuminati:Santa Monica, CA ISBN 978-0962913303
- The Alchemy of Possibility: Reinventing Your Personal Mythology (1998) Merrill West ISBN 978-1886708037
- Soul Seeds: Revelations and Drawings (2008) Cross Cultural Communications, New York ISBN 978-0-89304-089-5
- Psyche of Mirrors: A Promenade of Portraits (2012) Cross-Cultural Communications, New York ISBN 978-0-89304-361-2

Art

- Carolyn Mary Kleefeld: Visions from Big Sur by Michael Zakian (2008) The Frederick R Weisman of Art, Pepperdine University ISBN 1-882705-07-6

Translated Collections

- Vagabond Dawns (Korean/English bilingual edition) Translated by Irene Seonjoo Yoon (2012) Korean Expatriate Literature/Cross-Cultural Communications, ISBN 978-89-93575-55-2
- Zori Hoinari - Vagabond Dawns (Romanian/English bilingual edition) Translated by Dr. Olimpia Iacob (2013) Limes Publishing, ISBN 978-973-726-732-0
- Soul Seeds: Revelations and Drawings (Korean/English bilingual edition) Translated by Dr. Byoung K. Park (2014) Korean Expatriate Literature/Cross-Cultural Communications, ISBN Korean 978-11-85238-12-8, ISBN American 978-0-89304-996-6
- Soul Seeds Revelations and Drawings (Japanese/English bilingual edition) Translated by Naoshi Koriyama (2014) Coal Sack Publishing Company/Cross-Cultural Communications, ISBN Japanese 978-4-86435-174-4, ISBN American 978-0-89304-932-4
- Soul Seeds: Revelations and Drawings (Sicilian/Italian/English trilingual edition) Translated by Gaetano Cipolla, (2014) Legas Publishing, ISBN 978-1-939693-01-3
- The Divine Kiss/In the Flames of Dandelions (Sărut Divin/În Flăcările Păpădilor) with Ioan Nistor, (Bilingual Romanian/English) All poems translated by Dr. Olimpia Iacob, (2014) Limes Publishing, ISBN 978-973-726-854-9
- The Divine Kiss: An Exhibit of Paintings and Poems in Honor of David Campagna (Japanese/English bilingual edition) Translated by Naoshi Koriyama (2017) Coal Sack Publishing/Cross-Cultural Communications ISBN 978-4-86435-277-2 (Japanese), ISBN 978-0-89304-385-8 (American)
- The Divine Kiss: An Exhibit of Paintings and Poems in Honor of David Campagna (Greek/English bilingual edition) Translated by Manolis Aligizakis (2018) Libros Libertad Publishing, Ltd/Cross-Cultural Communications ISBN 978-1-926763-50-7 (Canadian), ISBN 978-0-89304-232-5 (American)
- The Divine Kiss: An Exhibit of Paintings and Poems in Honor of David Campagna (Sicilian/Italian/English trilingual edition) Translated by Marco Scalabrino and Gaetano Cipolla (2018) Legas/Cross-Cultural Communications ISBN 978-1-939693-20-4
