= Adelmar Faria Coimbra-Filho =

Brazilian biologist and primatologist

- Born: June 4, 1924; Fortaleza, Brazil
- Died: June 27, 2016 (age 92)
- Known for: Pioneer in studies and conservation of lion tamarins
- Awards: Augusto Ruschi Award from the Brazilian Academy of Sciences
- Scientific career
- Fields: Biology, Primatology

Adelmar Faria Coimbra-Filho (June 4, 1924 – June 27, 2016) was a Brazilian biologist and primatologist. He studies lion tamarins and their conservation. He is founder and Former Director of the Rio de Janeiro Primate Centre. Coimbra Filho's titi is named after him.

== Life and career ==
Coimbra-Filho was born in Fortaleza. He began his career in 1947. He rediscovered the black lion tamarin, and assisted in conservation of the golden lion tamarin through a zoo-based breeding program in collaboration with Devra G. Kleiman.

His awards and honors include the Augusto Ruschi Award from the Brazilian Academy of Sciences.
