= Michael Kleiman =

American film director

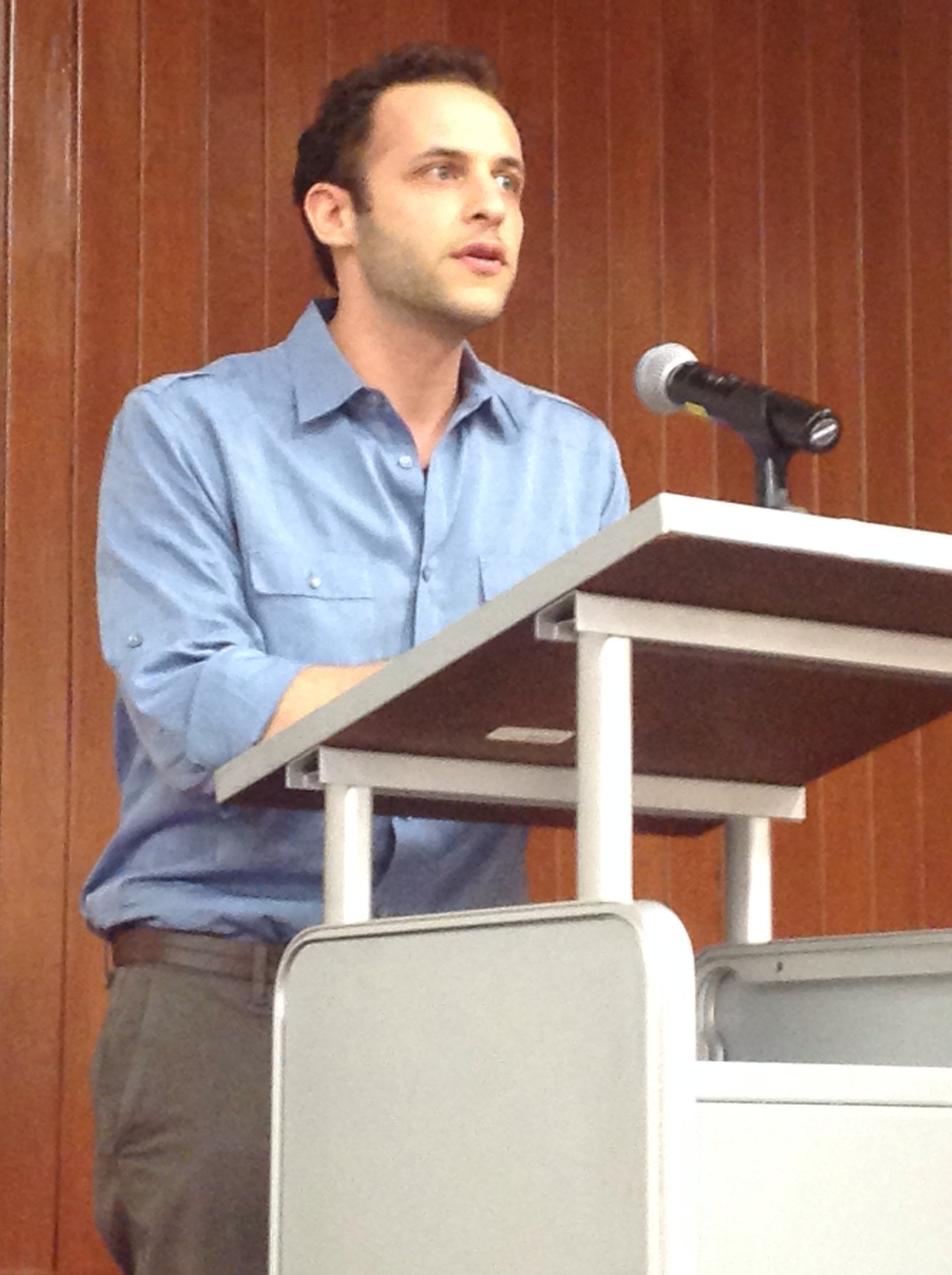
Kleiman at the presentation of Web at the Monterrey Institute of Technology and Higher Education, Mexico City

Michael Kleiman is a documentary filmmaker who has focused on films with social themes. He co-directed The Last Survivor, which was a MIPCOM pick for 2010 and Web, which premiered at the DOC NYC Film Festival where it won the Sundance Now Audience Award.

== Life ==
Kleiman was born in Long Island, NY. He became attracted to cinema as a child, especially after seeing Macaulay Culkin’s performance in Home Alone, then regularly imitated scenes from that movie (especially Keven McAllister’s scene, applying aftershave and screaming into the mirror) as well as scenes from My Cousin Vinny and The Fugitive, in part because it was the only time he was allowed to curse. This interest led him to making his own films in middle school and into high school.

Kleiman received a Fulbright Scholarship and studied film theory, history and criticism at the University of Pennsylvania, graduating in 2006. He discovered documentary making at college, seeing it as a way to combine his love for cinema with a desire to promote social change, working on a series of documentaries highlighting the work of the College Board and the Gates Foundation in public education reform.

He received a masters of public policy at the Kennedy School of Government at Harvard, with the aim of learning how policy is created and evaluated to relate this to filmmaking.

== Film career ==
Kleiman’s film career initially began with stints at the documentary department at HBO, working with filmmakers Andrew Bujalski and Albert Maysles as an editor and crew member. In 2009 he worked in the editorial department at Beeswax as a post-production assistant.

Shortly after graduation from the University of Pennsylvania, he teamed up with classmate Michael Pertnoy to found Righteous Pictures, dedicated to creating films with a progressive social agenda. Films with this organization include the documentary The Last Survivor in 2010, which he co-directed and co-edited. The Last Survivor is about survivors of genocides such as the Holocaust, Rwanda, Darfur and the Congo, and was a MIPCOM pick for 2010.

Kleiman’s second documentary feature is called Web, (2013) which he directed, co-edited and co-produced. The idea for “Web” came after reading Robert Wright’s book Nonzero, a speech by Bill Clinton on interdependence and learning about the One Laptop per Child program. Taking four years to make with government and private financing, the film premiered at the DOC NYC Film Festival in 2013. The documentary follows several Peruvian families as they gain computer and Internet access for the first time through the One Laptop per Child program as well as interviews with people such as author Clay Shirky, Wikipedia’s Jimmy Wales, Dennis Crowley of Foursquare, Scott Heiferman of Meetup and One Laptop founder Nicholas Negroponte . Kleiman spent ten months living in Peru, dividing his time in the towns of Antuyo in the mountains and Palestina in the Amazon rainforest . Web won the Sundance Now Audience Award at the 2013 DOC NYC Film Festival.

== Artistry ==
Kleiman considers himself as a film nerd/snob. He believes that documentaries, like any other kind of film, needs to tell a good story. Documentaries involve real people, which he believes is a plus in audience engagement.
