= Fernand Brouez =

Fernand Brouez (1861, in Wasmes – 1900, in Brussels) was the founder and publisher of La Société Nouvelle (The New Society). He initially edited the magazine with Belgian-born Arthur James, whom he met at the Université Libre de Bruxelles', and after 1889 with various other individuals.

The second son of Jules Brouez and Victorine Sapin, Fernand and his older brother Paul both enrolled at the Université Libre de Bruxelles, where Fernand initially failed at his studies. Switching between philosophy, law and medicine, he had still not placed his candidacy for a doctorate by the age of 29. Yet he managed to surround himself with the elite of Belgian, international intellectuals and artists of the time. He believed in socialism and social conscience. On 20 November 1884, the first edition of La Société Nouvelle was published, financed by his father Jules Brouez. It would become the most important magazine on social issues, arts, sciences and literature of the epoch. Fernand Brouez's contribution to French speaking Europe remains unparalleled. He fell victim to syphilis, either by sexual contact, his future wife being a possible silent carrier given her past, or according to several credible sources, from a cut at a course in anatomy when studying medicine. In 1896 he married Cornelia Hubertina Doff (1858-1942), the later Neel Doff. The character of André in her second book, Keetje, is based upon Fernand Brouez. Fernand Brouez was buried in the Brouez family vault at the Ixelles Cemetery on 3 July 1900.
