= David Campagna =

American actor

- Born: October 23, 1946; San Jose, California
- Died: March 6, 2017 (aged 70); Beverly Hills, California
- Occupation: Actor
- Spouse: Carolyn Mary Kleefeld

David Campagna (October 23, 1946 – March 6, 2017) was an American visual artist and actor, best known for acting as Christopher Walken's stand-in and stunt double. He was a native of Fremont, California.

== Career ==
After studying theater at Foothill College in Los Altos Hills, California, David Campagna moved to Los Angeles, to pursue a career as an actor. In 1973, he was hired as a page for ABC Television, working on several network shows, including The Merv Griffin Show, Laverne and Shirley, Happy Days, The Odd Couple, and The Lawrence Welk Show. Under the tutelage of acting teacher Jeff Corey, Campagna became a soap opera actor, with roles on General Hospital and The Young and the Restless.

He eventually became Christopher Walken's stand-in and stunt double in more than 15 films over 20 years.

Campagna was the inspiration for California poet and visual artist Carolyn Mary Kleefeld's 2014 book, The Divine Kiss: An Exhibit of Paintings and Poems in Honor of David Campagna. The book has been translated into bilingual Romanian/English, Japanese/English, and Greek/English editions, as well as a trilingual Sicilian/Italian/English edition.

Campagna married Kleefeld on Valentine's Day 2017. He died three weeks later, on March 6, 2017, of esophageal cancer, diagnosed three years earlier.
