= Charles Samuel =

Belgian sculptor

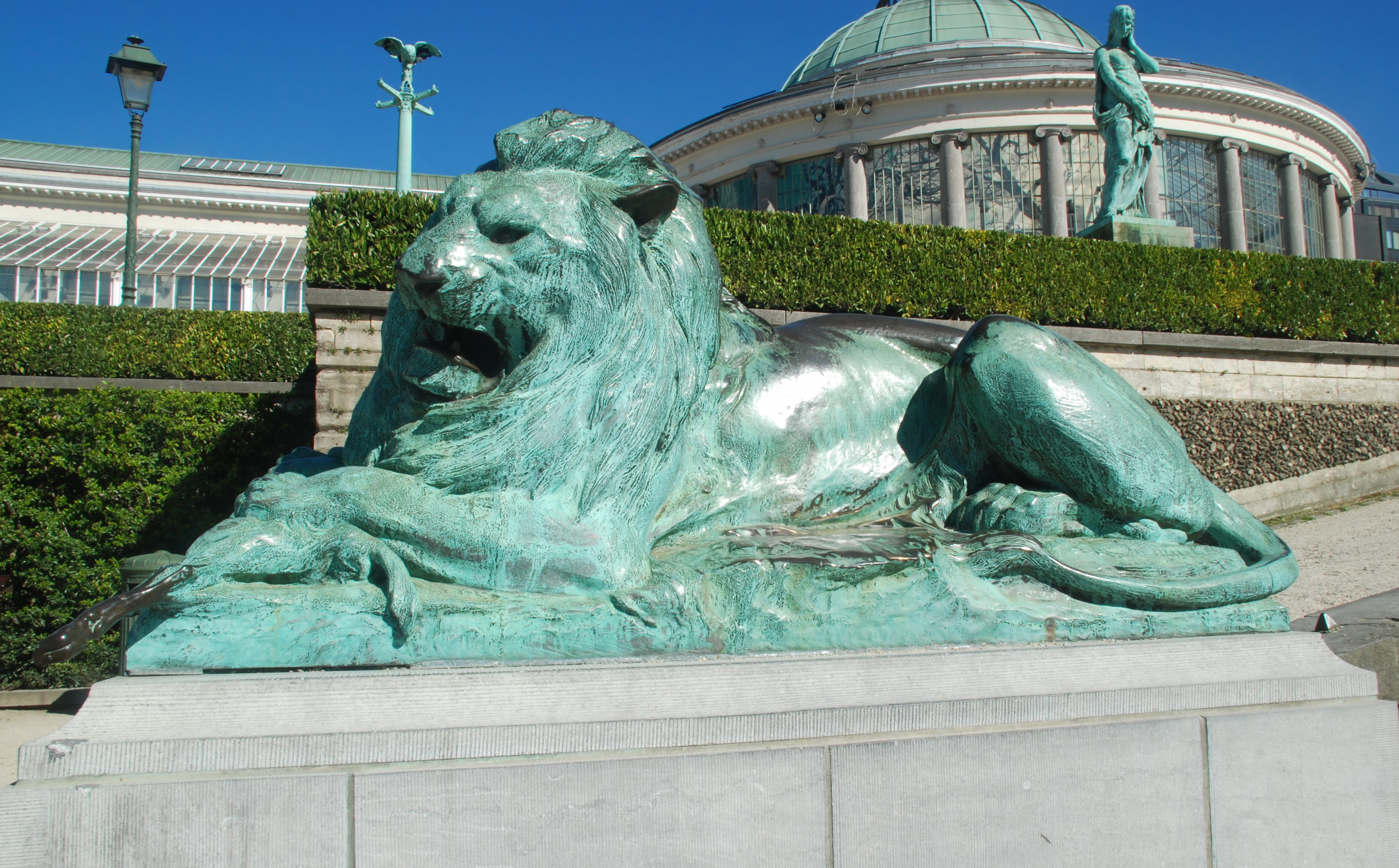
- The Lion, Botanical Garden of Brussels
- Born: 29 December 1862; Brussels
- Died: 31 January 1938 (aged 75); Cannes
- Known for: sculpture

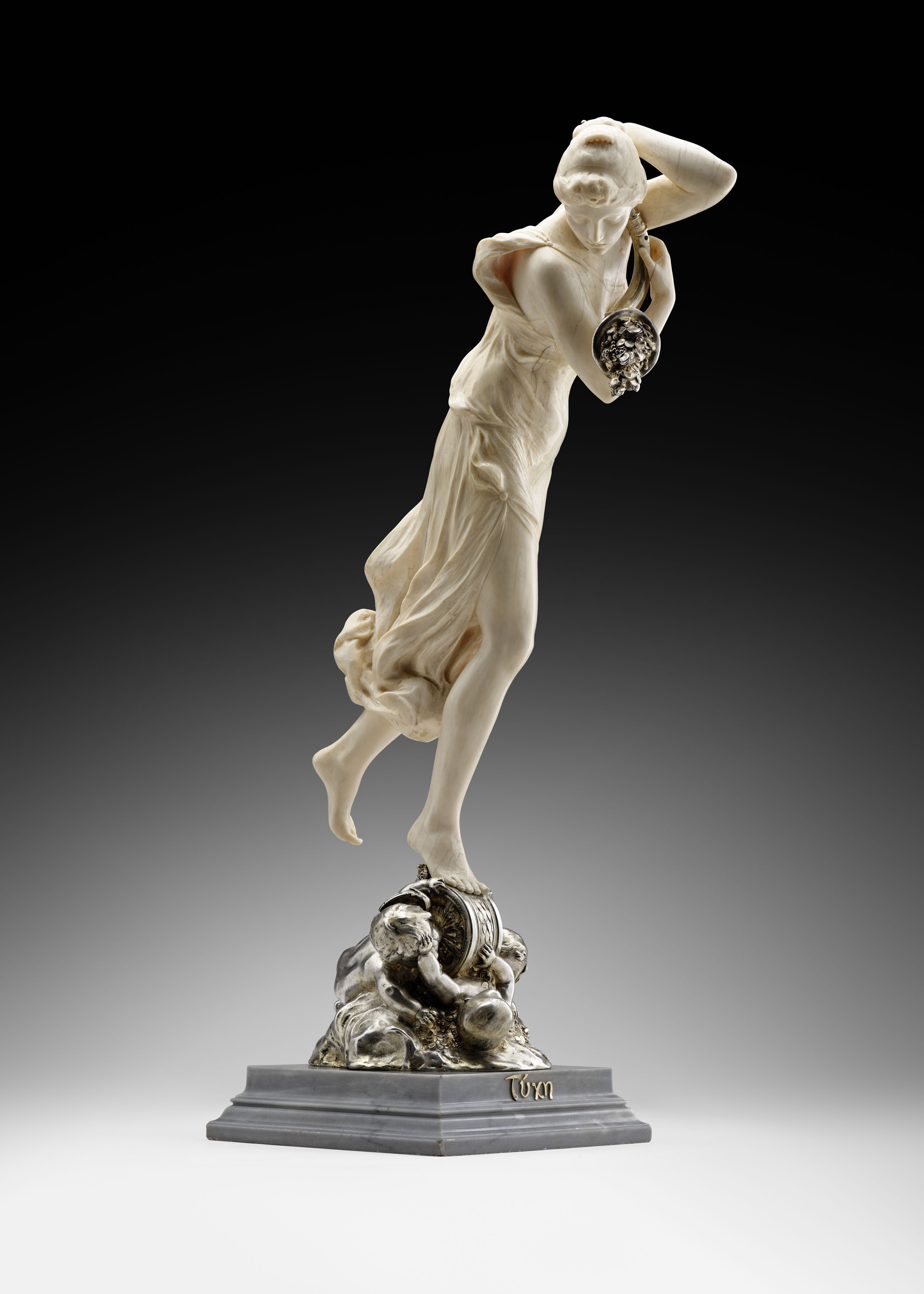
La Fortune (1894), Collection King Baudouin Foundation

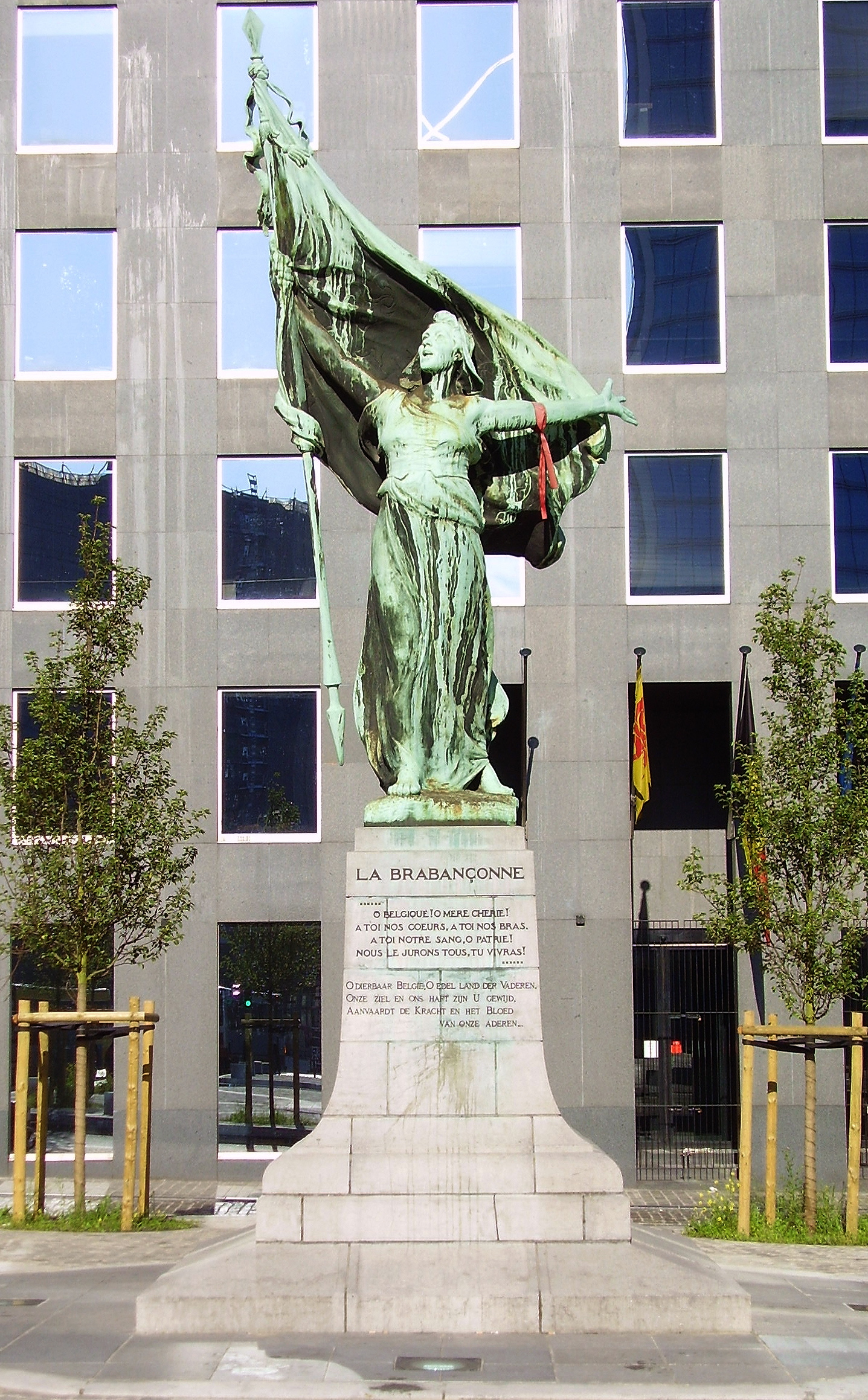
La Brabançonne, Brussels, 1930.

Charles Samuel (French pronunciation: [ʃaʁl samɥɛl]; 29 December 1862, in Brussels – 31 January 1938, in Cannes) was a Belgian sculptor, engraver and medalist.

== Life ==
Samuel was born in Brussels and trained there. He studied engraving with Léopold Wiener, sculpture with Eugène Simonis, Joseph Jaquet and Charles van der Stappen, and medal-making with the goldsmith and sculptor Philippe Wolfers. He began his career in 1889, from his house and workshop in Ixelles, which was the first project of noted Belgian architect Henri Van Dievoet. His work was part of the sculpture event in the art competition at the 1936 Summer Olympics.

His wife was the French pianist Clotilde Kleeberg.

== Work ==
- monument to the novelist Charles De Coster at the Place Flagey in Ixelles, modeled by Neel Doff, 1894
- The Lion, Botanical Garden of Brussels, circa 1898
- female figuration of La Brabançonne (Belgian national anthem, in French language of female though in Dutch of male grammatical gender), Surlet de Chokier square, Brussels, 1930
- bronze military memorial at the Ixelles Cemetery
- Vuakusu Batetela defends a woman from an Arab
