= Kleeman =

Kleeman is a surname. Notable people with the surname include:

- Alexandra Kleeman (born 1986), American writer
- Jenny Kleeman, British documentary film-maker and journalist
- Jessie Kleemann (born 1959), Greenlandic artist and writer
- Otto Kleemann (1855–1936), American architect

== See also ==
- Klee (surname)
