= Neel Doff =

Dutch writer

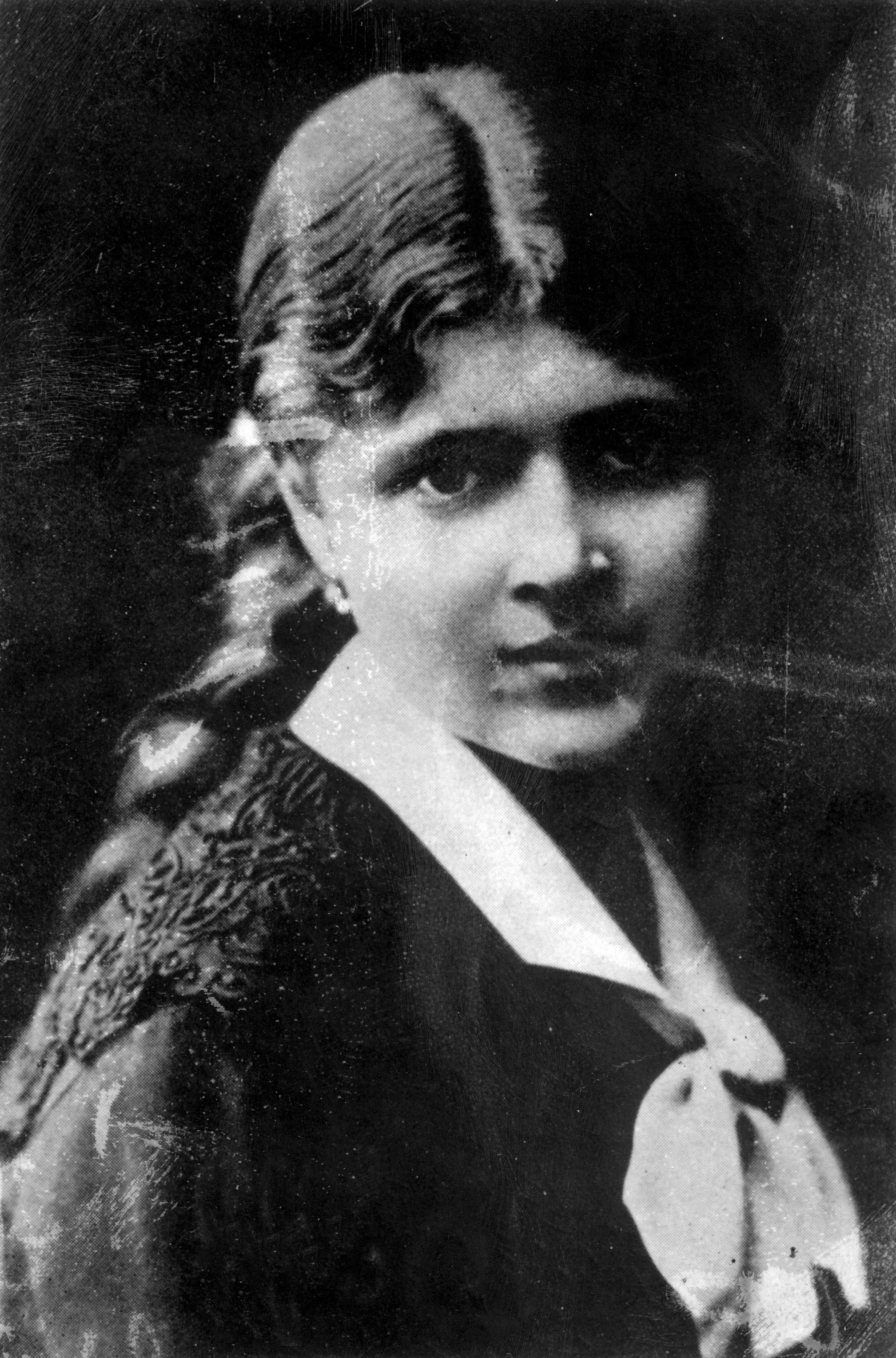
- Neel Doff as a young woman
- Born: Cornelia Hubertina Doff; 27 January 1858; Buggenum, Netherlands
- Died: 14 July 1942 (aged 84); Ixelles, Belgium
- Occupation: Writer

Cornelia Hubertina "Neel" Doff (27 January 1858 – 14 July 1942) was a writer of Dutch descent living and working in Belgium and mainly writing in French. She is one of the most important contributors to proletarian literature.

== Biography ==
Born in Buggenum, Netherlands, into a family of nine, Cornelia accompanied her family on its perennial successive moves (Amsterdam, Antwerp, Brussels) facing a progressively worsening poverty. Determined to fight her way from underneath the rag and tether class she started modeling for a large number of renowned Belgian painters (James Ensor, Félicien Rops) and to a lesser extent sculptors (Charles Samuel, Paul de Vigne). She posed as Charles de Coster's character Nele by Charles Samuel (Monument Charles de Coster, Charles de Coster Monument Place Flagey Ixelles) and for Paul de Vigne, The Little Dutch Girl (Royal Museums of Fine Arts of Belgium), and highly probably for the identical Metdepenningen (Ghent cemetery and Ben Cable Monuments Ben Cable Monument Chippiannock Cemetery, Rock Island in Illinois). In these artistic circles she met Fernand Brouez (1860–1900) whom she eventually married. Son of Jules Brouez, a rich notary and Victorine Sapin, Fernand Brouez financed and edited La Société Nouvelle, at that time considered the most valuable socialist economical magazine in the French language.

After Brouez's death she married Georges Serigiers, a prominent lawyer from Antwerp and family friend of the Brouez family. Years later, when looking at a cluster of youngsters through the window of the Serigiers stately home in Antwerp, the hurtful memories of her past came to life. She poured her heart and soul in her first book Jours de Famine et de Détresse (Days of Hunger and Distress). In picture like stories she tells the tale of a young girl, Keetje Oldema exposed to scorn and humiliation because of her hopeless misery, eventually forced into prostitution by her mother to feed her little brothers and sisters. Laurent Tailhade became her greatest fan and, fascinated by this journey of annihilated youth, defended her work at the 1911 Prix Goncourt. She lost the prize by one vote, but remained nevertheless very impressed with the honour of being nominated.

With Keetje and Keetje Trottin, Neel Doff finalised her autobiographical trilogy. She rounded the Doff saga off with various stories about her siblings in other works. In 1907 the Serigiers moved into their splendid new summer residence in Genk. Inspired by the villagers, one family in particular, Neel Doff puts her pen to paper. Tallying her work and enjoying her life as 'Grande Dame' within a selected social circle, she published many short stories in various magazines and periodicals. She also translated three works from Dutch into French.

In December 1929 the following quote by Thibaud-Gersen appeared in Le Courier Littéraire: "When will they award the Nobel Prize to the humble and genial Neel Doff"? These words were enough to spread rumours and speculation about the 1930 Nobel Prize awards. Unfortunately the myth that Neel Doff was nominated persists in various publications. (See "Neel Doff par elle même"; Marianne Pierson-Pierard; p. 21 and in the German translation published under the title Keetje Tippel from the Dutch text of Jours de Famine et de Détresse p. 5 introduction by Dr. Josh van Soer).

Many compared her work to that of Émile Zola. In her own words in reference to Émile Zola: "He wrote about it while I lived it". Also called "The Dostojevski of the North", the character of Keetje parallels that of Sonja in Crime and Punishment. Henry Poulaille, who became her editor after the death of her husband Georges Serigiers, praises her as surpassing Colette. Neel Doff's somewhat brutish writing style on proletarian issues remains however controversial. She was an autodidact and wrote as she saw and felt. Emile Verhaeren commented on Days of Hunger and Distress that it needed "galvanising". In 1930 Belgium paid tribute to her contribution to French Literature by appointing her Officer of the Order of the Crown (Belgium), one of Belgium's most prestigious awards.

On 14 July 1942, Neel Doff, embittered by the horrors of the war and suffering from kidney failure, died in her house, 16 rue de Naples, Ixelles, Belgium. In order to secure her estate she only left the author rights of her work to her dear friend Mrs. Helen Temersen, who being Jewish saw her welfare and worldly belongings in peril. Helen Temersen sold the author rights in the early 1970s to the publisher Meulenhoff in Amsterdam. The house in Ixelles was bequeathed to the children of Franz Hellens, author and librarian, who took up residence at the house and wrote there as well. The remainder of her estate went to various individuals. Several art effects, including a James Ensor, mysteriously disappeared from the Ixelles residence and are yet to be found.

== Publications in English translation ==
- Neel Doff: Keetje. Translated from the French by Frederic Whyte [1867-1941]. London, Hutchinson & Co, 1930.

== Original publications (in French) ==
- Jours de famine et de détresse, Paris, Fasquelle, 1911; Bruxelles, Labor, 1994; Arles, Actes Sud "Babel", 1994
- Contes farouches, Paris, Ollendorff, Paris, 1913; éd. Plein Chant, 1988
- Keetje, Paris, Ollendorff, 1919; Bruxelles, Labor, 1987.
- Keetje trottin, Paris, Crès, 1921, 1930; Bruxelles, Labor, 1999
- Michel, Crès, 1922
- Angelinette, Paris, Crès, 1923
- Campine, Paris, F. Rieder & Cie, Rieder 1926
- Elva, suivi de Dans nos bruyères, Paris, 1929; éd. Plein Chant, 2015
- Une fourmi ouvrière, 1931, Paris; Au Sans Pareil, 1935 (Repris par les éditions Spartacus, Paris).
- Quitter tout cela, suivi de Au jour le jour, éd. Entre Nous, Nemours 1937

== Biography ==
- Evelyne Wilwerth: Neel Doff (1858-1942). A biography. Peter Lang, New York, 1997. ISBN 9780820434834

== Film ==
- Keetje Tippel, a 1975 film by Paul Verhoeven depicting Doff's life. Distributed in English as Katie's Passion.
