= Sophia Kleegman =

Russian American gynecologist

Sophia J. Kleegman
- Born: July 8, 1901; Kiev, Russian Empire
- Died: September 30, 1971 (aged 70); New York
- Education: Bellevue Hospital Medical College
- Spouse: John H. Sillman
- Children: Two
- Scientific career
- Fields: Gynecology, obstetrics
- Workplaces: New York University College of Medicine

Sophia Josephine Kleegman (1901–1971) was a Russian American obstetrician, gynecologist, and sex education advocate. She was a pioneer in the study of infertility.

== Biography ==
Sophia Kleegman was born on July 8, 1901, in Kiev, Russian Empire to Israel and Elka Siergutz Kleegman. In 1906 her family emigrated to the United States, settling in New York. She was accepted into the second coeducational class of Bellevue Hospital Medical College (now the New York University School of Medicine) in 1920. Following her graduation in 1924, she held a residency at the Chicago Lying-in Hospital. Thereafter she practiced gynecology and obstetrics. In 1929 she was appointed to the faculty of obstetrics and gynecology at the New York University College of Medicine. She was the first woman to be appointed to the faculty. She joined the attending staff of Bellevue Hospital that same year.

From the 1930s on, Kleegman published several papers on the diagnosis and treatment of infertility. She was an early advocate of artificial insemination and the establishment of sperm banks. She had a highly successful private practice.

Kleegman became a clinical professor in gynecology and obstetrics in 1953. She led Bellevue's infertility clinic from 1958 until 1971. She wrote the 1966 book Infertility in Women with Sherwin Kaufman.

Kleegman died in New York on September 30, 1971.

== Personal life ==
As she was already established professionally, Kleegman retained her name when she married orthodontist John H. Sillman on December 31, 1932. They had two children, Frederick Holden (b. 1937) and Anne Marice (b. 1941).

== Selected publications ==
- Kleegman, Sophia J. (November 15, 1935). "Medical and Social Aspects of Birth Control". The Journal-Lancet. 45 (22). Minneapolis.
- Kleegman, Sophia J. (January 1939). "Recent Advances in the Diagnosis and Treatment of Sterility". The Medical Woman's Journal (46): 3, 1, 9.
- Kleegman, Sophia J. (May 1951). "Diagnosis and Treatment of Infertility in Women". Medical Clinics of North America. 35 (3): 817–846. doi:10.1016/S0025-7125(16)35282-8. PMID 13098507.
- Kleegman, Sophia J. (January 1954). "Therapeutic Donor Insemination". Fertility and Sterility. 5 (1): 7–31. doi:10.1016/s0015-0282(16)31504-7. PMID 13117078. S2CID 35314266.
- Kleegman, Sophia J. (October 1959). "Frigidity in Women". Quarterly Review of Surgery. 16: 243–248. PMID 14409638.
- Kleegman, Sophia J. (March 1966). "Educate the Educators". Fertility and Sterility. 17 (2): 160–164. doi:10.1016/s0015-0282(16)35881-2. PMID 5907040.
