= Norman Kleeblatt =

Curator, critic, and consultant

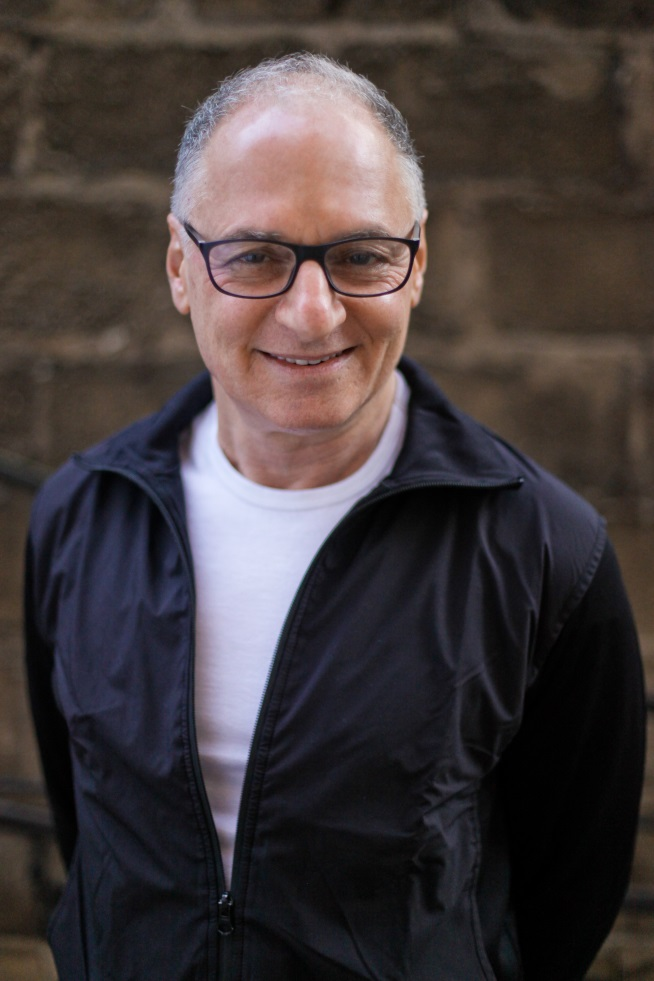
Norman Kleeblatt in 2013

Norman L. Kleeblatt is a curator, critic, and consultant based in New York City. A long-term curator at the Jewish Museum in New York, he served as the Susan and Elihu Rose Chief Curator from 2005 to 2017.

Kleeblatt has published in Art in America, Artforum, ARTnews, Art Journal, and The Brooklyn Rail. He has received fellowships and research grants from the Getty Research Institute, the Katz Center for Advanced Judaic Studies, the National Endowment for the Arts, the National Endowment for the Humanities, and the Rockefeller Foundation.

Kleeblatt serves as Secretary of the Board of the Vera List Center for Art and Politics of the New School and is President of the U.S. chapter of the International Association of Art Critics (AICA-USA).

== Education ==
Norman Kleeblatt received his A.B. in Art History from Rutgers University in 1971, and was awarded an M.A. and Diploma in Conservation in 1975 from the New York University Institute of Fine Arts.

== Exhibitions ==
In 1987, Kleeblatt curated "The Dreyfus Affair: Art, Truth and Justice" (1987), which explored the relationship between art and politics by examining visual responses to the Dreyfus Affair in France. For this exhibition, Kleeblatt received the Présidence d'honneur, Comité scientifique, Société internationale d'histoire. The accompanying catalogue received an Honorable Mention from Henry Allen Moe Prize for catalogues of distinction in the arts.

"Painting a Place in America: Jewish Artists in New York, 1900–1945" (1991, co-curator) focused on the choice faced by first generation Jewish-American artists to assimilate into the American cultural mainstream or to preserve their Jewish identities. The corresponding catalogue won the Henry Allen Moe Prize (second place) for catalogues of distinction in the arts and as co-recipient also won the National Jewish Book Award in the Visual Arts Category.

Kleeblatt’s 1996 exhibition "Too Jewish? Challenging Traditional Identities” confronted issues surrounding stereotypes, questions of assimilation, and the issue of Jewish identity in the multicultural art world.

In 1998, Kleeblatt co-curated with Kenneth Silver "An Expressionist in Paris: The Paintings of Chaïm Soutine"—the first major presentation of Chaïm Soutine's work in New York in nearly 50years. The exhibit focused on Soutine’s reception by his patrons, supporters, and critics. Kleeblatt received Second Place for the Best Exhibition at a New York City Museum from the International Association of Art Critics (AICA) and the catalogue was a finalist for the Alfred H. Barr, Jr. Award, College Art Association of America.

"John Singer Sargent: Portraits of the Wertheimer Family" (2000) reunited for the first time in more than sixty years the twelve formal portraits of the Wertheimer family painted by John Singer Sargent. This exhibition told the story of a friendship between artist and patron and offered a unique glimpse into the world of a privileged family of English Jews.

In 2001 the exhibit "Mirroring Evil: Nazi Imagery/Recent Art" contextualized controversial works by contemporary artists who employed images of Nazi villains rather than Holocaust victims. In 2008 “Theaters of Memory: Art and the Holocaust” presented eight artists’ works that related history surrounding World War II, the atrocities of genocide and mass destruction, and their attendant moral devastation.

"Action/Abstraction: Pollock, De Kooning, and American Art, 1940-1976" (2008–2009) reinterpreted Abstract Expressionism from the perspectives of influential, rival art critics Clement Greenberg and Harold Rosenberg. Kleeblatt won the Best Thematic Museum Show in New York City in 2008 from The International Art Critics Association, and the Outstanding Exhibition award from the Association of Art Museum Curators. The catalogue received a Banister Fletcher Award honorable mention and a National Jewish Book Award in the Visual Arts category.

“Mel Bochner: Strong Language” (2014) explored Mel Bochner's career-long fascination with the cerebral and visual associations of words. This exhibition was praised by The New York Times as an “elegantly produced exhibition” of a major New York artist. Apollo Magazine called it “...a brilliantly curated show [in which] Bochner reminds us that painting is not yet dead...” Yale University Press published the corresponding catalogue with essays by Kleeblatt and Bochner.

In 2015, Kleeblatt co-curated “From the Margins: Lee Krasner | Norman Lewis, 1945-1952” with Stephen Brown. This exhibition offered a parallel view of Lee Krasner and Norman Lewis, two key Abstract Expressionists who were often overlooked by critics in their time. Karen Rosenberg of the New York Times called it “...a nuanced, sensitive and profound exhibition” and Robert Pincus-Witten stated in Artforum, “This richly suggestive exhibition... What a delight!” The exhibit has been awarded “Best Thematic Museum Show in New York of 2014” by the US section of the International Association of Art Critics (AICA).

Kleeblatt curated "John Singer Sargent’s Mrs. Carl Meyer and Her Children" with curatorial assistant Lucy Partman in 2016. Focused on Sargent’s 1896 painting Mrs. Carl Meyer and her Children, the show was called an “engrossing and intimate exhibition” by the New York Times.

"Charlemagne Palestine’s Bear Mitzvah in Meshugahland" (2017) was a site-specific installation of hundreds of teddy bears and plush toys related to Charlemagne Palestine's Jewish roots in Brooklyn.

== Selected publications ==
=== Exhibition catalogues ===
- From the Margins: Lee Krasner and Norman Lewis, 1945–1952, 2014
- Mel Bochner: Strong Language, 2014
- Action/Abstraction: Pollock, De Kooning, and American Art, 1940–1976, 2008
- A Culmination of Contradictions: Jules Olitski’s Last Decade, 2007
- Sighting Joan Snyder/Citing her Critics, 2005
- Sculptor’s Action/Spectator’s Arena, 2005
- Mirroring Evil: Nazi Imagery/Recent Art, 2001
- The Carcass and the Canvas’ und andere Soutine-geschichten, 2000
- John Singer Sargent: Portraits of the Wertheimer Family, 1999
- An Expressionist in Paris: The Paintings of Chaïm Soutine, 1998

=== Articles in journals ===
- "Getting to res.o.nant: Mischa Kuball's intervention at the Jewish Museum Berlin," Brooklyn Rail (July-August 2019).
- "The Water Lilies: American Abstract Painting and the Last* Monet," Brooklyn Rail (September 2018).
- "'The Carcass and the Canvas' and Other Chaïm Soutine Stories," Hyperallergic (September 14, 2018).
- "Alan Solomon," Brooklyn Rail (November 2016).
- "Norman Kleeblatt on Barbara Hepworth," Artforum: 55 (November 2015): 296-297.
- "Looking at Art. Strange Bedfellows: from Fairfield Porter to David Park to Lisa Yuskavage and Peter Doig, Contemporary artists have been riffing on Vuillard," Art News: 111 (September 2012): 96-101.
- "Moral Hazard: Norman L. Kleeblatt on the Art of Artur Zmijewski." Artforum: 47 (April 2009): 154-160.
- “Disobedient Images." Images vol 1, (2007): 15-21.
- "Report from Berlin. Israel's Traumas and Dreams: a mega-exhibition titled The New Hebrews used a combination of art and documentary material to tackle a century of Israeli culture and history." (May 2006): 106-115. Review of Doreet LeVitte Harten with Yigal Zalmona, eds. "Die Neuen Hebräer: 100 Jahre Kunst in Israel." Exh. cat. Martin-Gropius Bau, Berlin, May 20-September 5, 2005. Berlin: Nicolai, 2005.
- "Identity Roller Coaster," Art Journal: 64, 1 (spring 2005). For thematic investigation, solicited essays from Johanne Lamoureux, Elisabeth Sussman, Sylvester O. Ogbechie, and Reesa Greenberg, and wrote the Introduction.
- "Istanbul Biennial," Art News: 102 (December 2003): p. 128.
- "Verre spiegels van de herinnering." Nexus, Tilburg, Netherlands, 34 (2002): 127-139.
- "Master Narratives/Minority Artists," in Art Journal: 57/3 (Fall 1998): pp. 29–35.
- "Autour du Corps d'Alfred Dreyfus," in Les Cahiers du Judaïsme 2 (Summer 1998): pp. 37–42.
- "Identity Politics: Multivalent Voices," in Art in America: 83 (December 1995): pp. 29–31, 35.
- "Rassismus und Degradierung," in the brochure "Dreyfus: die Affäre," Deutsche Oper, Berlin, May 1994.

=== Selected chapters in books ===
- "The Edge of Abstraction: Norman Lewis and the Joyner/Giuffrida Collection," with Lucy Partman. In Courtney J. Martin, ed. Four Generations: The Joyner Giuffrida Collection of Abstract Art. New York: Gregory R. Miller & Co., 2016.
- “The Critic Collects: Clement Greenberg.” In Annette Weber, ed. Jewish Collectors and Their Contribution to Modern Culture, Heidelberg: Winter, 2011, pp. 269–280.
- “Theater of Memory: Art and the Holocaust." In Sophia Komor and Susanne Rohr, eds. The Holocaust, Art, and Taboo: Transatlantic Exchanges on the Ethics and Aesthetics of Representation, Heidelberg: Winter, 2010, pp. 107–117.
- “The Nazi Occupation of the White Cube: Piotr Uklański’s The Nazis and Rudolf Herz’s Zugzwang,” in Impossible Images: Contemporary Art after the Holocaust, ed. Shelley Hornstein, Laura Levitt, and Laurence Silberstein. New York: New York University Press, 2003.
- “Master Narratives/Minority Artists,” in Complex Identities: Jewish Consciousness in Modern Art, ed. Matthew Baigell and Milly Heyd. New Brunswick, NJ: Rutgers University Press, 2001, pp. 1–12.
- "Departures and Returns—Sources and Contexts for Moritz Oppenheim’s Masterpiece The Return of the Volunteer," in., Die Entdeckung des jüdischen Selbstbewusstseins in der Kunst, Georg Heuberger and Anton Merk, eds, Frankfurt: Wienand Verlag, 1999, p. 113 ff,
- "Politique et contexts culturels: l'exposition Dreyfus de 1987 au Musée juif de New York," in Michel Denis, Michel Lagrée, and Jean-Yves Veillard, eds. L'Affaire Dreyfus et l'opinion publique en France et à l'étranger. Rennes: Presses Universitaires de Rennes, 1995, pp. 333–41.
