= Peter Ludwig Kühnen =

German painter

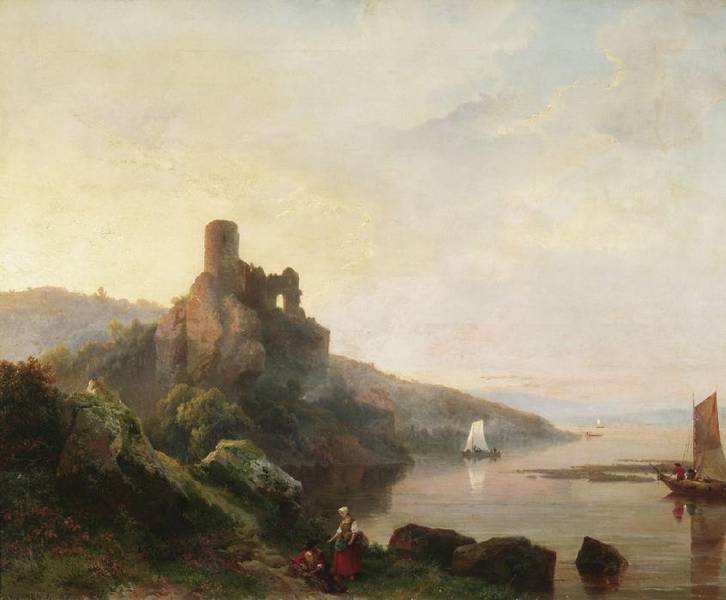
Romantic Rhine landscape with ruin at sunset

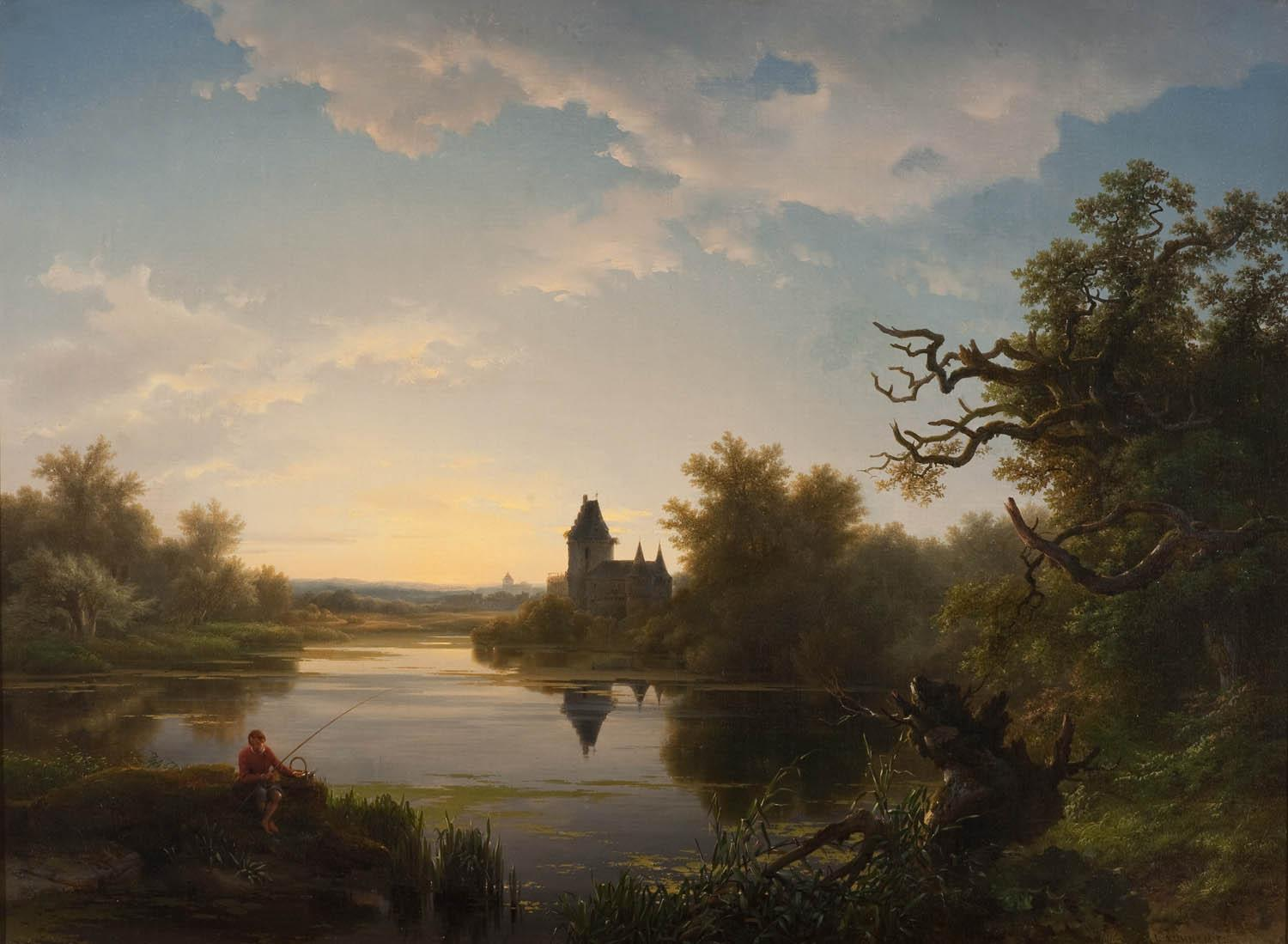
Lonely Fisherman at Twilight, 1841

Peter Ludwig Kühnen (also known as Pieter Lodewyk Kuhnen or Pierre-Louis Kuhnen) (14 February 1812 – 23 November 1877) was a German painter, watercolorist and lithographer.

== Biography ==
He was born in Aachen on 1812 as the son of a local businessman, Simon Gerlach Kühnen and his wife, Anne Plum and was orphaned at the age of thirteen. Supported by the Aachen city council, he subsequently received training as a lithographer in the Joseph La Ruelle (de) printing house in Aachen. He learned painting with Johann Baptist Joseph Bastiné (de) then created his own landscapes on 1830. He was commissioned to paint Prosper Louis, 7th Duke of Arenberg son, a fact that exposed him to a wider audience.

Supported by several other Belgian painters like Gustave Wappers, Eugène Joseph Verboeckhoven or Ferdinand de Braekeleer, he settled in Brussels but stopped to paint miniature because of an eye disease.

From then on, he devoted his time to landscape painting in which he achieved his greatest successes.

His paintings were exposed at several international art exhibitions.

In 1842 he won the silver medal at the Brussels Salon, and three years later the gold medal.

In 1846 he won a third class medal of the Paris Salon, in 1848 he was ranked out of competition then in 1850 again a first prize award in Bruges.

He was also represented four times on the painting exhibition of the Art Association of Bremen as well as in London and America, so he was well known and received numerous commissions from art lovers and Belgian nobility members. In addition, he was appointed painting and drawing tutor for some talented young artists such as François Roffiaen, Anna Boch or Euphrosine Beernaert (nl). He is considered as a Tervuren School (nl) precursor close to the views of Barbizon school.

Furthermore, the Belgian royal family favorably heard about Kühnen. King Leopold I of Belgium introduced him as art teacher for his only daughter, Charlotte of Belgium.

In 1856, Kühnen received the Knight's Cross of the Order of Leopold from Belgian king.

In 1865, when Charlotte already the wife of Maximilian I of Mexico became empress of Mexico, she honored Kühnen with the National Order of Our Lady of Guadalupe.

Peter Ludwig Kühnen was married to Anne Barbe Joséphine Hubertine, née Beckers (1807-1867), herself well known as Hubertine Kühnen in landscape painter society.

Their son, Simon Gerlach Leopold Victor Kühnen (born 25 June 1836 in Aachen, died 21 October 1892 in Assenois-Habaru), was known as a worthy portrait painter.

For more than 40 years Peter Ludwig Kühnen committed himself to art collection. After his death in Schaerbeek, he bequeathed most of his works to the Royal Museum of Modern Art in Brussels and the Suermondt-Ludwig Museum in Aachen.
