= Karl Heinz Klee =

Austrian sports official and lawyer

Karl Heinz Klee (9 June 1930, Innsbruck – 21 September 2008, Rum, Austria) was an Austrian sports official and a lawyer.

== Life ==
Karl Heinz Klee was an avid skier and as a lawyer also frequently dealt with legal issues concerning skiing. From 1966 to 1972 he was president and after that honorary president of the Austrian Ski Federation. He became famous at the 1972 Winter Olympics when he was outraged by the exclusion of Karl Schranz due to past unauthorized advertising: "Sport has always and everywhere operated as a profession." He was the founder and president of the Austrian Ski Pool, Secretary General of the Organizing Committee of the 1976 Winter Olympics (1973–1977), president and honorary president of the Austrian Ski Federation and the Innsbruck Federation of Alpine Skiers, an honorary member of the Austrian Olympic Committee and a legal expert on skiing law and the law of costs.

Until 2007, Klee was Chairman of the Committee on Legal Issues and Security of the International Ski Federation (FIS). He was also Secretary General of the Organizing Committee of the 1976 Winter Olympics in Innsbruck and a member of the International Court of Arbitration for Sport in Lausanne and President of the Tyrolean Bar Association.

A doctor of law, Klee represented the Austrian Ski Federation in the blood doping violations involving Walter Mayer at the 2002 Winter Olympics in Salt Lake City and the doping incident at the 2006 Winter Olympics in Turin. Hermann Maier was also a client of his after a motorcycle accident. He remained professionally active until the end of his life.

Klee was a recipient of the Gold Medal for Service to the Republic of Austria, the Award of Distinction of the State of Tyrol, the Honorary Ring of the city of Innsbruck and the Decoration of Honor of the State of Styria, Commander of the Ordre national du Mérite, and a Knight of the Royal Swedish Order of the Polar Star.

Klee died on 21 September 2008, leaving behind a wife and a daughter.
