= Naoshi Koriyama =

Japanese poet (born 1926)

- 郡山 直
- Born: 3 November 1926 (age 99); Kikai Island, Kagoshima Prefecture
- Education: University of New Mexico
- Alma mater: University at Albany, SUNY
- Occupation: Poet
- Writing career
- Language: Japanese, English, and Kikai

Naoshi Koriyama (郡山 直, Kōriyama Naoshi; born 3 November 1926) is a Japanese poet and author. Born in Kikai Island, Kagoshima Prefecture, he first attended the University of New Mexico. He graduated from the New York State College for Teachers at Albany in 1954 and returned to Japan to teach and write poetry. His interest in poetry came from using it as a tool to combat his feelings of loneliness when he transferred from New Mexico to Albany in 1951. From 1967 until 1997, he was a professor at Toyo University and holds the title of professor emeritus. He has published nine collections in English, three from Japanese to English, and in 2011, he published his first volume entirely in Japanese. He speaks Japanese, English, and his native Kikai. In August 2025, he attended the 99th anniversary of the Tokyo Kikai Association.
