= Clotilde Kleeberg =

French pianist

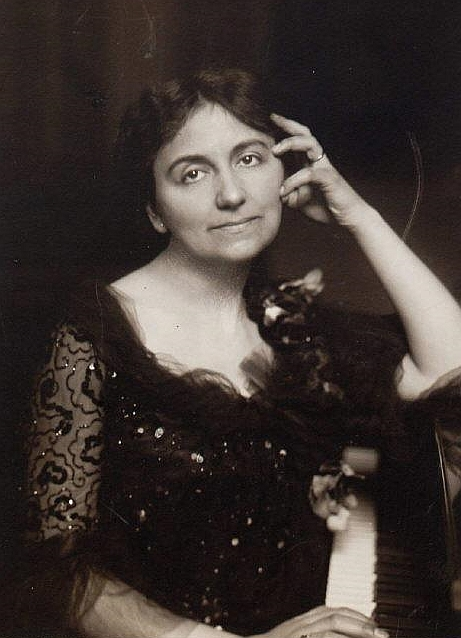

Background information
- Born: 27 June 1866; Paris, France
- Died: 7 February 1909 (aged 42); Brussels, Belgium
- Instrument: piano

Clotilde Kleeberg (27 June 1866 – 7 February 1909) was a French pianist. She was also known as Clotilde Kleeberg-Samuel.

The daughter of Martin Kleeberg and Henriette Cahn, natives of Germany, she was born in Paris. She began taking private piano lessons at the age of five and later studied at the Conservatoire de Paris with Louise Massart. She received first prizes at the Conservatoire in 1877 and 1878 and went on to further studies with Théodore Dubois. She performed her first concert in Paris in December 1878 in front of an audience of 4000 people. She went on to perform throughout Europe from 1881 to 1909. She was also very popular in England.

Théodore Dubois dedicated his Six Poèmes Sylvestres to Kleeberg. As well as works by composers such as Beethoven, Mendelssohn, Schumann and Chopin, she also played compositions by Cécile Chaminade, Camille Saint-Saëns, Friedrich Gernsheim, Max d'Ollone, Eduard Schütt and Ernst Eduard Taubert.

In 1894, she was named an Officier d'Académie and, in 1900, an Officier de l'Instruction Publique. The French composer Camille Saint-Saëns considered her to be a brilliant pianist and Clara Schumann also commented favourably on her playing.

In 1900, she married Belgian sculptor Charles Samuel. The couple settled in Brussels

Kleeburg died in Brussels at the age of 42 following a tour through Switzerland, possibly from pneumonia.
