= Pascal Kleiman =

French disc jockey (born 1968)

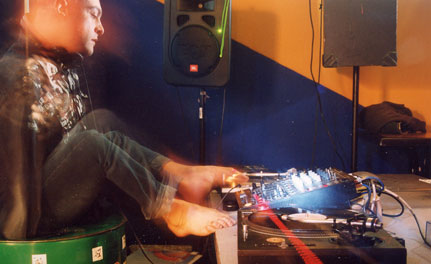

Background information
- Also known as: Amazing Pascal
- Born: 19 April 1968 (age 58); Toulouse, France
- Genres: Dance music
- Occupations: DJ, music producer
- Years active: 1989–present

Pascal Kleiman (born 19 April 1968) is a French DJ based in Valencia, Spain, who also produced music as DJ RamBam.

== Career ==
Born in Toulouse, Kleiman started in the world of music from the explosion of French free radio during the 1980s. With his radio program Virus, he showcased independent underground punk and funk with the likes of ESG, Liquid Liquid, and early electronic beats of A Split-Second and Front 242.

Kleiman studied law in Toulouse, but in 1989, with the revolution of the acid house movement, Kleiman found his calling as a DJ and record producer performing and creating music for the first rave parties in France. Under the name D'Scual, in 1992 he took on his first artist residency at a nightclub in Madrid called club "Attica". He soon moved to Valencia in 1993 where he has been playing a few times at N.O.D. alongside Kike Jaen.

In 1996, he created the record label "UV" to produce alternative artists in the electronic music scene in Valencia, Spain.

Born without arms or hands due to Distilbene he is known by many as "The Amazing Pascal", or "The DJ who spins with his feet", He plays a mixture of ambient, dub, progressive, and psychedelic electronic music from European, South African, American and Asian artists. Owning his record shop gives him access in the latest electronic dance music.

A DJ since 1989, he has played at notable clubs and festivals worldwide, including Space Ibiza, Barraca, Chocolate, NOD, ACTV in Valencia, Attica, Specka, La Riviera in Madrid, Les Nuits Fauves, Rex Club in Paris, Block in Tel Aviv as well as others in Italy, Portugal, the Netherlands, Belgium, Germany, Russia, and India.

He worked as a DJ between 2000 and 2010 at the festival Apokalypsa (Czech Republic), at the Festival Phonotica in Asturias (Spain), the Sonar festival Barcelona, and at La Notte Bianca Lecce (Italy). He has shared the stage with Jeff Mills, Laurent Garnier, Derrick May, Jerome Sydenham, Maurice Fullton, Jon Cutler, Dj Garth, Christian Varela, and Titonton Duvante among others.

As a DJ at Desert Advanture in Israel from 2006 to 2011, he shared the stage with Darwish, Perfect stranger, and U-Recken among others.

He has been a DJ for the social integration of persons with disabilities in many events from associations in Spain, the Netherlands, and Russia as well as UNICEF in Paris.

He is a current or former artist on the following labels: Incense Records, Psylove Records, AOA, 2Real, Click On Music, and SoTrincha Recordings. He is also the director of Big Foot Records.

Pascal Kleiman was the subject of Angel Loza's 2008 documentary film Héroes. No hacen falta alas para volar, which was nominated for a Goya Award in the Best Short Documentary category.

== Discography ==
- 2007 – Konichiwa Pascal Kleiman & Jose Caparos – Age of Aquarius
- 2007 – Empty Your Mind Pascal Kleiman & Psycho Abstract – Psylove
- 2007 – Heroes, Nothing is Impossible – Short movie about Pascal Kleiman
- 2006 – Psylove Pascal Kleiman & Psycho Abstract – Psylove
- 1997 – Double LP Amelia, Over the Age – Underground Valencia
- 1997 – Abstrax Elements of Art – Underground Valencia
- 1997 – Electric Reverting Elements of Art – Underground Valencia
- 1996 – Escalator Age of Aquarious – Prodisk
- 1996 – Tecnicidad Club House – Prodisk
- 1995 – Aerial Age of Aquarious – Prodisk
- 1996 – Rhythm Sex Prodigy – Prodisk edited by Pirate Records

== Activities ==
=== Clubs in Spain ===
Latex – a one-year Artist residency

Also at: La Real, La Florida, Chocolate, ACTV, Puzzle, Barraca, Pachá, Space, Radical, Mogambo, RDC, Repvblica, 69 Monos, El Peach, La Macarena, Tito's, DC 10, Sala 4 and many more...

=== Played with ===
- Laurent Garnier in Rex Club, Paris and Barraca, Valencia
- DJ Garth (Grayhound Recordings) in Sala 4, Valencia
- Maurice Fullton in 69 Monos, Valencia
- John Cutler (Distant Music) in Phonotica, Asturias
- Titonton Duvante (Residual Records) in Latex, Valencia
- Ellie Kleiman of Ohio (his sister) (Residual Records, in Cincinnati)
- Mekanika, CPU and Alex Tolstey in Barraca
- VJ Kyle Lyons (VJ LOOPS), Valencia

=== Residencies ===
- Latex Community (Spain)
- Tribe of Frogs (UK)
- Misa de 8 (Spain)

=== Festivals ===
- Sónar, Barcelona
- Fonótica, Asturias
- Musica di Estratti – Lecce, Italy

=== Projects and shows ===
Tienes Talento TV show on Cuatro (channel) (Spain)

== Owner ==
- 1997 – Love Sonico/ Love Wear – Local Valencian underground clothing and record shop
- 2006 – Psylove – Carrying underground clothing, records, CDs and VJ/DJ equipment
- 2007 – Audio/Visual School – classes for DJs and VJs (Psylove, 3rd floor)
