= Vladimir Kleiman =

Russian engineer (1930–2014)

Vladimir Leonidovich Kleiman (Russian: Владимир Леонидович Клейман; November 11, 1930 – April 7, 2014) was a Soviet and Russian scientist and designer in the field of rocketry. Hero of Socialist Labour (1975), winner of the Lenin Prize (1964) and the USSR State Prize (1980).
