= Meetup =

Social media platform

MeetUp, Inc.
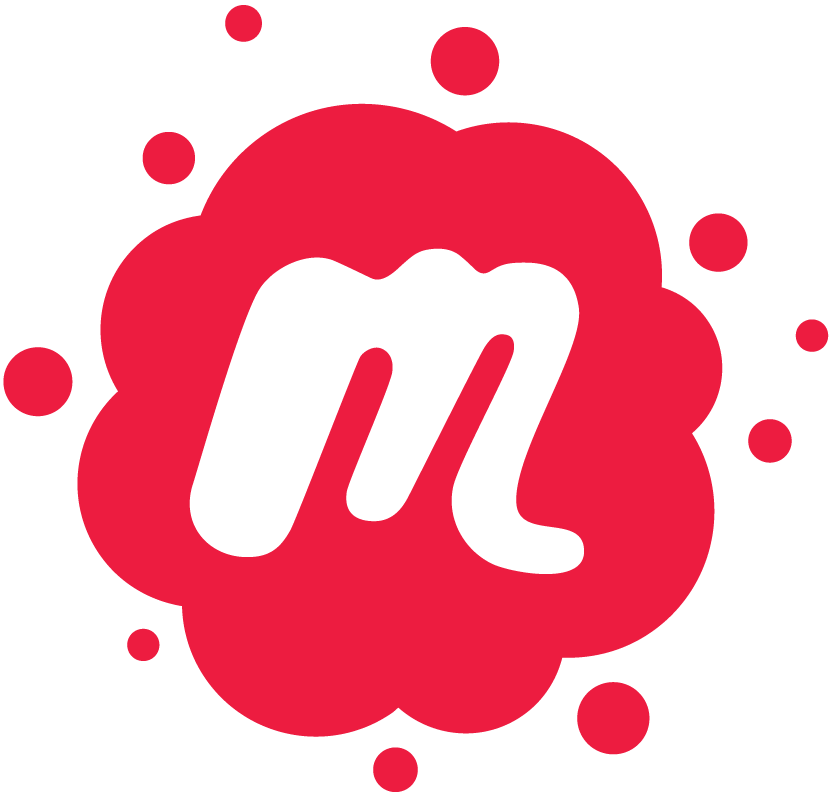

- Screenshot
- Website type: Social media, membership software
- Available in: English (default), French, German, Italian, Japanese, Polish, Portuguese, Spanish, Korean, Dutch, Thai, Russian and Turkish
- Founded: June 2002; 24 years ago
- Owner: Bending Spoons
- Industry: Social media
- Website: www.meetup.com
- Commercial: Yes
- Registration: Required to join a group
- Users: 60 million+
- Launched: June 12, 2002; 24 years ago

Meetup is an American social media platform and social networking service for hosting and organizing in-person and virtual activities, gatherings, and events for people and communities of similar interests, hobbies, and professions. The service has 60 million users. The company has both free tiers and paid tiers.

Headquartered in New York City, the company was founded in 2002 by Scott Heiferman and four others. It was acquired by WeWork in November 2017, AlleyCorp in March 2020, and Bending Spoons in January 2024.

== History ==
Meetup was founded in June 2002 by Scott Heiferman and four co-founders. The idea for Meetup came from Heiferman meeting his neighbors in New York City for the first time after the September 11 attacks. Heiferman was also influenced by the book Bowling Alone, which is about the deterioration of community in American culture. Some initial funding for the venture was raised from friends and family, which was followed by a funding round with angel investors.

The early version of Meetup generated revenues by charging a fee to venues in exchange for bringing Meetup users to their business. Once enough users added themselves to a group, Meetup sent the group members an email, asking them to vote on one of three sponsoring venues for the group to meet.

In 2003, Meetup won the "Community Websites and Mobile Site" Webby Award.

Meetup was originally intended to focus on hobbies and interests, but it was popularized by Presidential hopeful Howard Dean in 2004. Meetup developed paid services to help the Dean campaign to meet with Meetup users. Dean also publicized Meetup groups of supporters in his speeches and on his website; at the peak of Dean's campaign, 143,000 users had joined Meetup groups for Dean supporters.

In early 2005, Meetup began to charge a fee for group organizers. Initially, changes to the website had to be approved by two committees.

In 2008, Union Square Ventures invested in the company.

In 2009, Meetup started running hackathons, where employees came up with new features that would be implemented if their coworkers supported it. In July 2009, the company was profitable and had $9 million in annualized revenues.

Meetup had 8 million users in 2010.

The website was redesigned in September 2013. Meetup had 25.5 million users by 2013.

In October 2013, Meetup acquired Dispatch, a struggling email collaboration company.

In March 2014, a hacker shut down Meetup with a DDoS attack, the hacker claimed to be funded by a competitor. The hackers asked for a ransom of $300.

In February 2017, Meetup created 1,000 #resist Meetup groups with the intention of coordinating protests in response to the Trump travel ban. This caused some supporters of Donald Trump to leave the site or call for a boycott. Meetup also partnered with a labor group to organize anti-Trump protests.

Meetup was acquired by WeWork in November 2017 for about $156 million. By that time, Meetup had raised $18.3 million over 11 years. Some former employees said there was a 10% layoff after the acquisition.

In 2018, Scott Heiferman resigned as CEO and former Investopedia CEO David Siegel took his place after a convincing interview with WeWork CEO Adam Neumann. Heiferman became Chairman of the company.

In October 2019, Meetup began to test a different pricing model in two US states, reducing the costs that must be paid by organizers of $23.99/month or $98.94/six months, but requiring users to pay a $2 fee in order to RSVP for events, leaving several users angry.

In March 2020, WeWork sold Meetup to AlleyCorp and other investors, reportedly at a substantial loss, and Kevin P. Ryan of AlleyCorp was added to the board of directors of Meetup.

In January 2024, Bending Spoons acquired Meetup, resulting in various controversial policy changes.

== See also ==
- Mobilizon – Open source event planning software
