= Devra G. Kleiman =

American biologist

- Born: November 15, 1942; The Bronx, New York, U.S.
- Died: April 29, 2010 (aged 67); Washington, D. C., U.S.
- Education: University of Chicago; University of London
- Scientific career
- Fields: biology; conservation biology
- Workplaces: National Zoological Park (United States); University of Maryland

Devra Gail Kleiman (November 15, 1942 – April 29, 2010) was an American biologist who helped create the field of conservation biology. She is known for her work to conserve endangered species, especially the golden lion tamarin of Brazil. Her efforts to use zoos to manage genetics of rare species was "one of the greatest success stories in the history of modern zoos," according to Steven Monfort, director of the Smithsonian Conservation Biology Institute. She is also known for her efforts to breed pandas at the National Zoo.

== Life and career ==
Born in the Bronx, Kleiman attended the University of Chicago, intending to go into medicine. However, after taking a baby dingo home to her mother's house, where it wrecked the basement, and working on a project to tame wolves, she shifted her major to animal behavior, graduating in 1964. She received a Ph.D. in zoology from University of London in 1969. Kleiman joined the staff of the National Zoo in Washington, D.C. in 1972 as one of the first female scientists on staff. In 1979, she was named head of the Department of Zoological Research and in 1986 rose to assistant director for research. She was also appointed to the biology staff at University of Maryland where she served as adjunct professor.

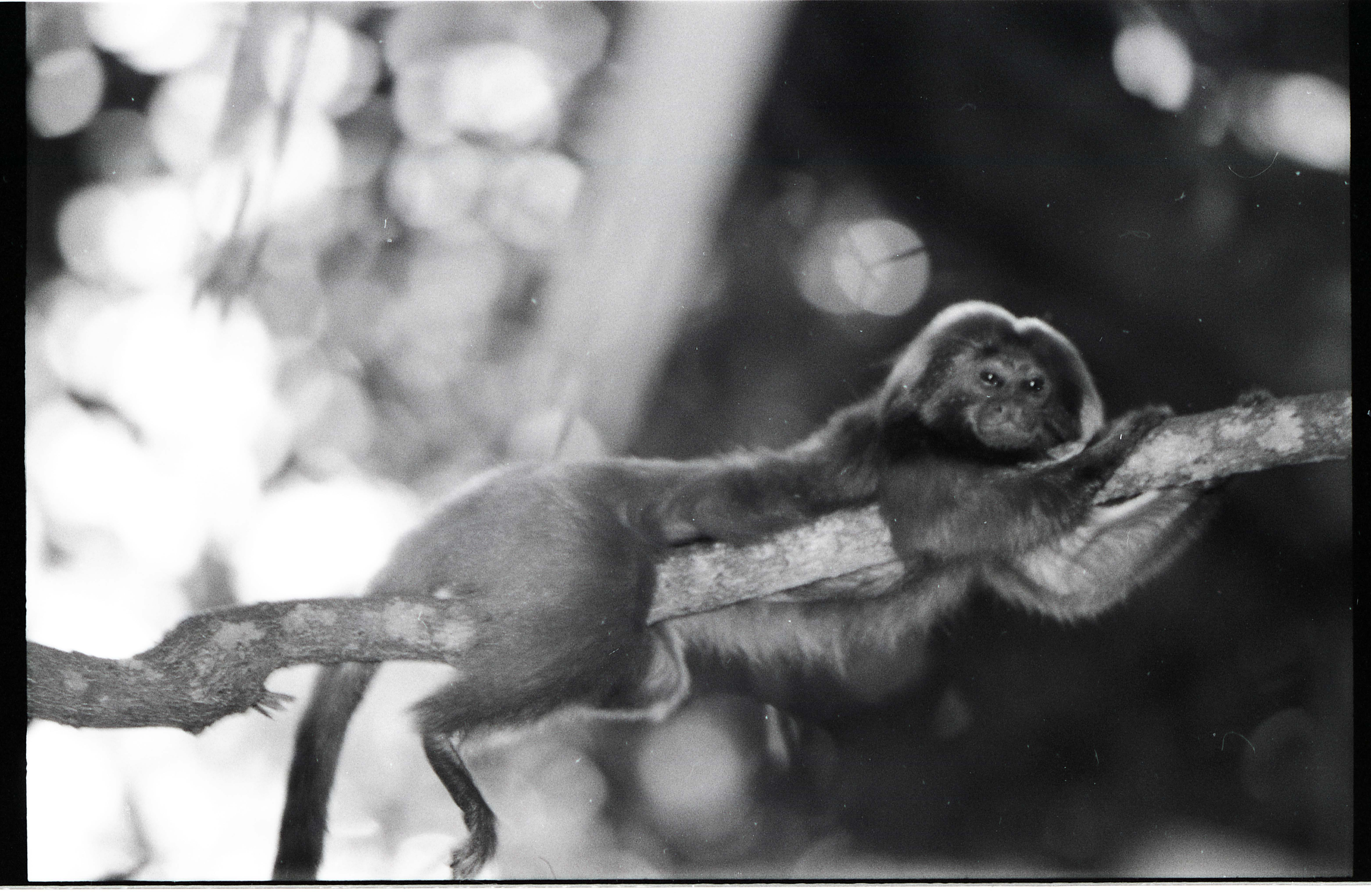
Golden Lion Tamarin, photographed by Devra Kleiman in 1997.

Kleiman's greatest success was with the golden lion tamarin, a small, reddish-orange monkey that inhabits Brazil's coastal forest. In the early 1970s she responded to an emergency alert from Brazilian biologist Adelmar Coimbra Filho, who reported that the tamarin population was down to several hundred in the wild and only 75 in captivity. Kleiman worked with Filho to convince more than a dozen zoos to engage in a cooperative lending program to foster breeding. She also used genetic data to try to assure stronger offspring. Kleiman and Filho also worked to preserve and restore large swaths of habitat for the tamarin. By the time of Kleiman's death, there were about 1,600 golden lion tamarins in the wild and 500 in zoos around the world.

Kleiman also greatly advanced scientific knowledge of the panda. When the Chinese government donated a pair of pandas to the National Zoo in 1972, there was massive public interest in their breeding. However, the first four pregnancies all failed. Kleiman led a large team that eventually discovered that the conventional wisdom about pandas—that they are solitary creatures—was incorrect. After the zoo modified their living situation to allow interaction and socialization, the next pair of pandas successfully produced a baby.

Kleiman's publications include Wild Mammals in Captivity and Lion Tamarins: Biology and Conservation.

Kleiman has a scientific advancement award named after her.

She died of cancer at George Washington University Hospital in Washington, D. C.

== Awards ==
- The First Award Devra Kleiman Scientific Advancement Award was presented posthumously to Devra Kleiman in 2014 at the AZA Annual Conference in Orlando.
