= Stowitts Museum & Library =

Coordinates: 36.6210°N 121.9182°W

The Stowitts Museum & Library in Pacific Grove, California, United States, was dedicated to the work, art and legacy of the American painter Hubert Julian Stowitts (1892–1953) and other overlooked and neglected fine arts painters of the 20th century. It was located at 591 Lighthouse Avenue, suite 21.
