= Bernard Kleiman =

American lawyer

Bernard Kleiman (1928-2006) was an American lawyer.

== Early life ==
Born in Chicago, Kleiman grew up in Kendallville, Indiana, where his father was a scrap metal dealer. He played center on the varsity basketball team in high school, and graduated in 1944.

He delayed his acceptance to Purdue University to enlist in the Army. He toured with the Army basketball team and served in Korea. His military service was cut short by scarlet fever. He returned to Purdue and graduated in 1951, having majored in metallurgical engineering. He attended the Northwestern University School of Law, graduating in 1954.

== Legal career ==
In 1960, Kleiman became counsel for District 31 of the United Steelworkers Union, covering Illinois and Indiana. He spearheaded a successful that forced Illinois to reapportion its legislature to assure it followed the principle of one person one vote.

Impressed by Kleiman's accomplishments, I. W. Abel, the union's president, named him the union's general counsel in 1965. As general counsel Kleiman often served as the union's chief negotiator, helping make steelworkers some of the world's highest-paid blue-collar workers. During his service as general counsel, Kleiman negotiated a 1973 agreement that barred strikes in the steel industry for a decade. The agreement was designed to curb steel imports, because six months before every contract deadline, automakers and other steel users began greatly increasing their purchases from abroad.

Kleiman negotiated contracts that helped keep several steel companies afloat during the 1980s, when the industry was traumatized by recession and imports. He helped negotiate an affirmative action agreement for the steel and aluminum industries, paving the way for minority workers. The aluminum agreement was upheld in a landmark Supreme Court case, United Steelworkers v. Weber.

He negotiated with many leading companies, including United States Steel, Kaiser Aluminum, Bethlehem Steel, Goodyear and Bridgestone Firestone.

Leo W. Gerard, the USWA's president, was quoted as saying that “It is difficult to overstate his impact on the union....His role with the union was much broader then the typical duties of general counsel.”

In the 1980s, Kleiman negotiated deals with two companies that were close to bankruptcy, the Wheeling-Pittsburgh Steel Corporation and the Allegheny Ludlum Corporation, allowing them to pay smaller compensation packages than steelmakers in better financial shape. When the industry rebounded in the late 1980s, he spearheaded efforts to restore a pattern in which all steelmakers provided similar wages and benefits.

Kleiman stepped down from the general counsel's position in 1997, but remained special counsel to the union's president. He officially retired in the summer of 2006, but continued working, e.g., in the union's two-month-old strike against Goodyear.

== Civil rights activities ==
Kleiman was instrumental in bringing the Civil Rights Act to the steel industry in 1974, when a federal judge issued a consent decree establishing goals for hiring women and minority workers and promoting them. This opened jobs to both blacks and women.
