= Minna Kleeberg =

American poet

Minna Cohen Kleeberg (July 21, 1841 in Elmshorn, Duchy of Holstein – December 31, 1878 in New Haven, Connecticut, United States) was a German-American poet.

== Biography ==
Her father, Marcus Cohen, a medical doctor, gave her a careful education. At 14, she wrote for a journal in Hamburg, and later for one in Budapest and for L. Stein's Der Freitag-Abend. After her marriage in 1862 to Rabbi L. Kleeberg, she lived in Rhenish Prussia, where she moved in a circle of literary men, chief among them Emil Rittershaus.

In 1866 Minna Kleeberg emigrated to the United States, living until 1877 in Louisville, Kentucky, where her husband had been elected rabbi of a congregation, and removing thence to New Haven.

== Works ==
Most of her poems were published in Stein's Freitag-Abend at Frankfurt. In 1865, her poem "Ein Lied vom Salz" (A lyric about salt), a plea for the removal of the tax on salt in Prussia, spread her reputation. She had an abiding interest in public and patriotic questions: The Franco-Prussian War, the Fifteenth Amendment, Friedrich Hecker, the emancipation of women, and the cause of liberty and democracy were among her themes. Jewish national and religious feelings were equally a source of inspiration. The aspersions cast upon Jews by Wagner and Billroth she repelled with indignant vigor. Her children and the joys and sorrows of domestic life were also notable themes of her verse.

In the United States, she was a frequent contributor to Das New-Yorker Belletristische Journal. A collection of her poems, Gedichte, was published in 1877.

== Sources ==
- Wilson, J. G.; Fiske, J., eds. (1892). "Kleeberg, Minna" . Appletons' Cyclopædia of American Biography. New York: D. Appleton.
