= Hans Kleefeld =

Hans Kleefeld (7 April 1929 – 10 March 2016) was a Canadian identity designer, known from his work for companies such as Bank of Montreal, Air Canada, Tim Hortons, Air Jamaica and Toronto-Dominion Bank. Hans was born in Berlin and moved to Toronto, Ontario, Canada in 1952. He taught at the Ontario College of Art and Design for many years and subsequently at Sheridan College, Ontario.

Hans was one of the Canadian designers featured in the 2018 Canadian documentary Design Canada.
