= Scott Heiferman =

American entrepreneur

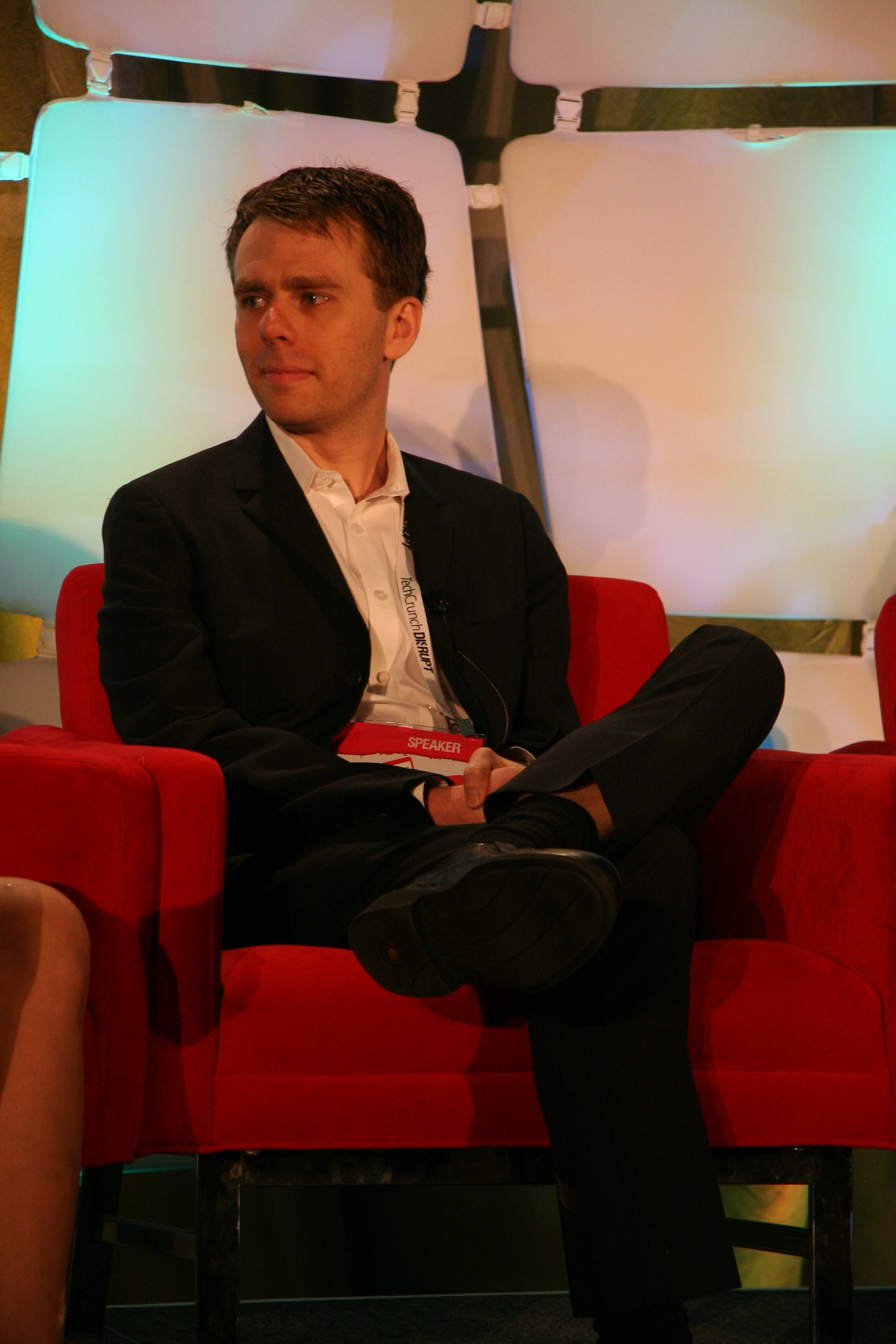
- Scott Heiferman at TechCrunch Disrupt in May 2010
- Born: 1972 (age 53–54); Homewood, Illinois
- Education: University of Iowa
- Known for: Founding Meetup

Scott Heiferman is an American community organizer and entrepreneur. Heiferman co-founded Meetup and was CEO from 2002 to 2018.

== Early life ==
Scott Heiferman was born in 1972 in Homewood, Illinois. Heiferman has four siblings. While attending Homewood-Flossmoor High School, Heiferman sold coupon books for a nearby town, earning enough to pay for his first year of college.

He attended the University of Iowa, where he began his studies as an engineering student. He later changed his degree to business and graduated in 1994.

== Career ==
Scott Heiferman's first job out of college was in Montvale, New Jersey working for Sony as an 'Interactive Marketing Frontiersman.' He worked at Sony from 1994 to 1995.

While there, Heiferman helped develop their first corporate website.

In 1995, he moved to New York City, and started an online ad-agency called i-traffic, which was dedicated to online media. I-traffic grew to about 100 employees, before it was purchased by Agency.com in 1999 for $15 million. Heiferman sold the company just before the end of the dot-com bubble. He continued working for Agency.com until 2000.

After Heiferman left Agency.com, he worked at McDonald's for a few weeks, starting in 2000.

=== Meetup ===
At the time of the September 11 attacks, Heiferman lived just a few miles from the Twin Towers. The attack caused him and his neighbors to meet each other for the first time, on the roof of his building. The experience made Heiferman interested in the idea of face-to-face interactions and community. Heiferman was influenced by the book Bowling Alone, which is about creating connections between strangers and the deterioration of community in American culture. He was also a fan of the band Luna and often went to their concerts alone, because he could not find other fans to go with.

These events caused Heiferman to start Meetup in 2002 with five co-founders and 10 employees. Around the same time, Heiferman also started a photo-sharing service called Fotolog, which he sold five years later for $90 million. During Howard Dean's 2004 Presidential campaign, Dean persuaded supporters to create or join local Meetup groups. In 2004, Meetup reached one million users and Heiferman was named "Innovator of the Year" by MIT Technology Review. Subsequently, then Presidential hopeful Barack Obama promised to attend any Meetup event of supporters that can get at least 100 attendees.

In 2005, Heiferman made the unexpected decision of charging users a fee to start and run Meetup groups, rather than using an advertising-based business model. Afterwards, the activity on Meetup dropped 95%, but rebounded over time. The company made a profit for the first time in 2009. By 2017, Meetup had 32 million members in 182 countries. That same year, Facebook invested in new features in a competing service called Facebook Groups. In response, Heiferman developed a plan to redesign Meetup to focus more on activities than groups. The re-design was also based on feedback from Meetup employees. In late 2017, Meetup was acquired by WeWork.

In 2018, Scott Heiferman stepped down as CEO and former Investopedia CEO David Siegel took his place. Heiferman became Chairman of Meetup.

== Personal ==
Scott Heiferman has a daughter and a son, born in 2010 and 2014 respectively.
