= Giovanna Gray Lockhart =

American nonprofit executive

Giovanna Gray Lockhart is an American nonprofit executive. She served as executive director of the Frances Perkins Center, an organization dedicated to workers’ rights advocate Frances Perkins.

== Career ==
Lockhart became executive director of the Newcastle, Maine-based Frances Perkins Center in July 2023. After assuming the position, she claimed, “I have always been a huge admirer of Frances Perkins and consider her one of the most important women in our country’s history.”

In December 2024, the Biden administration designated the Frances Perkins homestead (where the Center is located) as the Frances Perkins National Monument. Lockhart responded, "With a national monument designation, not only will [Frances Perkins] receive the recognition she deserves, but more people will also be able to learn about her work and future generations will be inspired by her steadfastness, intelligence, and courage."

Prior to the Frances Perkins Center, Lockhart served as a senior aide to Senator Kirsten Gillibrand (D-NY) and Glamour’s Washington, D.C. editor. She also held senior roles at venture-backed companies, including The Riveter and Impact at the Wing.

Lockhart sits on the Board of Trustees for the Waynflete School in Portland, Maine.
