= Heather Cox Richardson =

American historian (born 1962)

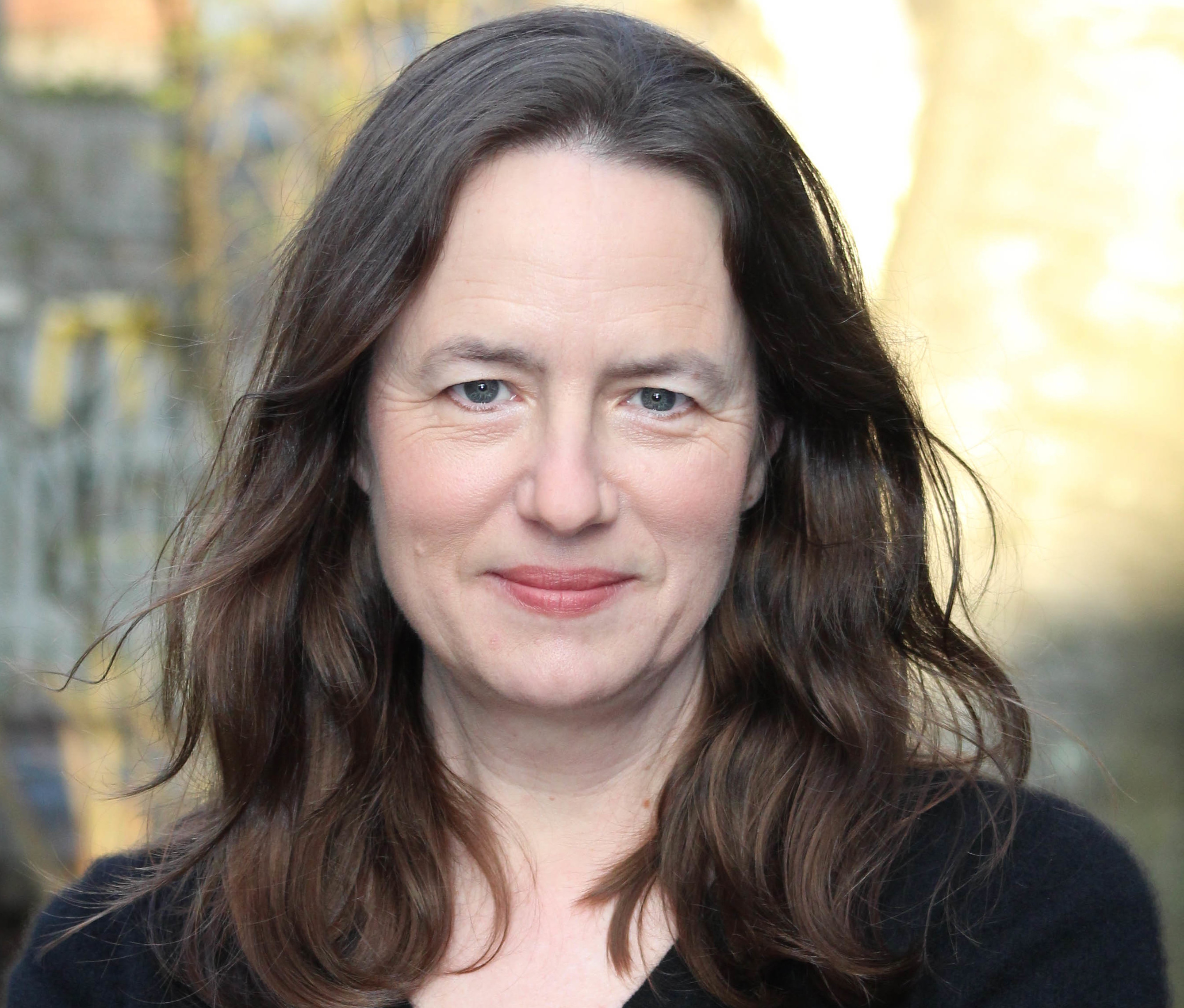
- Richardson in 2016
- Born: October 8, 1962 (age 64); Chicago, Illinois, U.S.

Academic background
- Education: Harvard University (BA, MA, PhD)
- Academic advisors: David Herbert Donald; William Gienapp

Academic work
- Institutions: Boston College; Massachusetts Institute of Technology; University of Massachusetts, Amherst

Heather Cox Richardson (born October 8, 1962) is an American historian who is a professor of history at Boston College, where she teaches courses on the American Civil War, the Reconstruction Era, the American West, and the Plains Indians. She previously taught history at MIT and the University of Massachusetts Amherst. Richardson has authored seven books on history and politics. In 2019, she started publishing Letters from an American, a nightly newsletter that chronicles current events in the larger context of American history, particularly focusing on the health of American democracy. As of July 2025, the newsletter had over 2.6 million subscribers, making it one of the most popular Substack publications.

== Early life and education ==
Born in Chicago in 1962 and raised in Maine, Richardson attended Phillips Exeter Academy in Exeter, New Hampshire. She received her AB, MA, and PhD from Harvard University, where she studied under the historians David Herbert Donald and William Gienapp.

== Projects ==
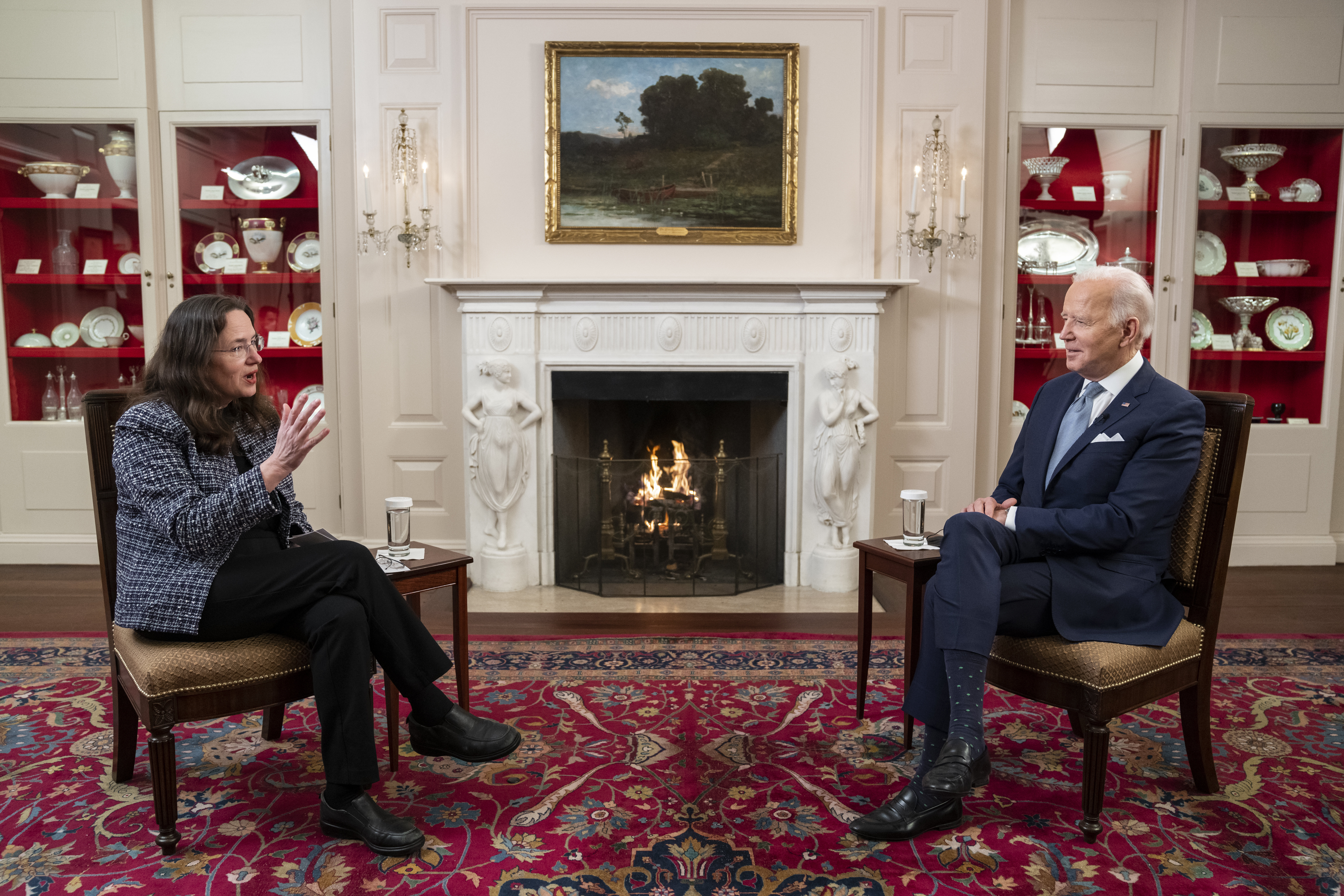
Richardson interviewing President Joe Biden in February 2022

As a historian, Richardson advocates studying history to learn how to distill complex situations into something easier to understand. She does this through her newsletters, books, and podcasts.

=== Newsletter: Letters from an American (2019–present) ===
In September 2019, Richardson began writing a daily synopsis of political events associated with the impeachment inquiry into President Donald Trump. Originally posting late every evening or in the early hours of the next day on her Facebook page, Richardson pivoted to writing a daily newsletter, entitled Letters from an American. The newsletter deals with contemporary events she explains and relates to historical developments, with a focus on the health of American democracy.

As of December 2020, Richardson was "the most successful individual author of a paid publication on . . . Substack" and on track to bring in a million dollars of revenue a year. The newsletter received a "Best of Boston" award for "2021 Best Pandemic Newsletter" from Boston magazine. By January 2024, the newsletter had about 1.3 million people reading each edition. The Nation described her journalistic voice as "sincere, humble, approachable, and jargon-free."

Following the 2025 assassination of Charlie Kirk, Richardson wrote on Substack that the alleged killer "was not someone on the left" and "appears to have embraced the far right", statements later challenged by prosecutors' evidence. Richardson later said that she "included that one sentence based on what we knew at the time". Vox correspondent Eric Levitz wrote that Richardson's post "illustrates the hazards of tribalistic thinking".

=== Democracy Awakening: Notes on the State of America (2023) ===
In 2023, Richardson published her seventh book, Democracy Awakening: Notes on the State of America. She said it grew out of her Letters from an American online newsletter that she began in 2019, and from subsequent interactions with her readers. Those newsletter writings—where she attempts to put the day's news into a historical framework—form the basis of the book. Democracy Awakening examines the roots of fascism in American history leading up to the democratic backsliding that many fear could bring the country to the brink of losing its democracy. The book makes the case that Trump was no outlier, but rather inevitable given the support the Republican Party had given to Christian nationalism, racism, and corporations over the previous 70 years. As she describes it, Democracy Awakening seeks "to reclaim both American history and language about who we are, [and to argue that] authoritarians rise by perverting that language and that history."

=== Podcast: Now and Then (2021–2023) ===
Richardson co-hosted the podcast Now & Then with fellow historian Joanne B. Freeman. In February 2022, Richardson interviewed U.S. President Joe Biden.

=== How the South Won the Civil War (2020) ===
In How the South Won the Civil War: Oligarchy, Democracy, and the Continuing Fight for the Soul of America (2020), Richardson argued that America was founded with contradicting ideals, with the ideas of liberty, equality, and opportunity on one hand, and slavery and hierarchy on the other. Victory in the American Civil War should have settled that tension forever, but at the same time the Civil War was being fought, Americans were also moving into the West. In the West, Americans found and expanded upon deep racial hierarchies, meaning that hierarchical values survived in American politics and culture despite the crushing defeat of the pro-slavery Confederacy. Those traditions—a rejection of democracy, an embrace of entrenched wealth, the marginalization of women and people of color—have found a home in modern conservative politics, leaving the promise of America unfulfilled. Dana Elizabeth Weiner of Wilfrid Laurier University found the book beautifully written, with valuable insights about oligarchy in American politics since the 1600s. Deborah M. Liles, a professor at Tarleton State University praised Richardson's ability to connect events into a narrative along with illuminating the role of equality in the Constitution, connecting western ideology with those from the Old South, and showing how oligarchs retained power.

=== Podcast: Freak Out and Carry On (2017–2018) ===
Between 2017 and 2018, she co-hosted the NPR podcast Freak Out and Carry On.

=== To Make Men Free (2014) ===
In To Make Men Free: A History of the Republican Party (2014), Richardson extended her study of the Republican Party into the twentieth and twenty-first centuries. This book studied the entire life of the Republican Party, from its inception in the 1850s through the presidency of George W. Bush. Believing a small group of men who controlled all three branches of government were turning the country into a slavocracy, the party's founders united against "slave power". These Republicans articulated a new vision of an America in which all hardworking men could rise. But after the Civil War, Republicans began to emulate what they originally opposed. They tied themselves to powerful bankers and industrialists, sacrificing the well-being of ordinary Americans. A similar process took place after World War II, when Republicans under Robert A. Taft sought to dismantle New Deal policies and prop up the wealthy. However, in both cases, reformers within the party were able to temporarily stop this trend, first with Theodore Roosevelt during the Progressive Era, and then Dwight D. Eisenhower, Jacob Javits, and Nelson Rockefeller, who enforced integration and maintained the New Deal.

The Nixon and Reagan administrations represented yet another fall from the party's argued founding purpose. It is ironic, Richardson argues, that Republicans treated Barack Obama with an unprecedented level of disrespect, as Obama's rise from humble beginnings to the highest office in the nation embodied the vision of the original Republicans. In a new afterword, Richardson argues the irony of one of the January 6, 2021 rioters storming the Capitol carrying the Confederate flag, despite the Republican Party's having started in the 1850s as a popular movement against the men who would lead the Confederate States of America.

=== Website: We're History (2014–2020) ===
In 2014, she co-founded a history website, werehistory.org, where she was a co-editor.

=== Wounded Knee (2010) ===
Wounded Knee: Party Politics and the Road to an American Massacre (2010), focused on the U.S. Army's slaughter of Native Americans in South Dakota in 1890. She argued that party politics and opportunism led to the Wounded Knee Massacre. After a bruising midterm election, President Benjamin Harrison needed to shore up his support. To do so, he turned to the Dakotas, where he replaced seasoned Indian agents with unqualified political allies, who incorrectly assumed that the Ghost Dance Movement presaged war. In order to avoid spending cuts from Congress, the army responded by sending one-third of its force. After the event, Republicans, intent on stifling the resurgent Democrats, tried to paint the massacre as a heroic battle.

=== West from Appomattox (2007) ===
In West from Appomattox: The Reconstruction of America after the Civil War (2007), Richardson presented Reconstruction as a national event that affected all Americans, not just those in the South. She incorporated the West into the discussion of Reconstruction. Between 1865 and 1900, Americans re-imagined the role of the federal government, calling upon it to promote the well-being of its citizens. However, racism, sexism, and greed divided Americans, and the same people who increasingly benefited from government intervention—white, middle-class Americans—actively excluded African-Americans, Native Americans, immigrants, and organized laborers from the newfound bounties of their reconstructed nation.

=== The Death of Reconstruction (2001) ===
Richardson extended her earlier study of Republican policy into the postwar period with The Death of Reconstruction (2001). Unlike other historians, she focused her analysis of the period on the "Northern abandonment of Reconstruction". Building on the earlier work of C. Vann Woodward, she argued that a more complete understanding of the period required appreciation of class, not only race. As Reconstruction continued into the 1870s and especially the 1880s, Republicans began to view African-Americans in the South more from a class perspective and less from the perspective of race that had driven their earlier humanitarianism. In the midst of the labor struggles of the Gilded Age, Republicans came to compare "the demands of the ex-slaves for land, social services, and civil rights" with those of white laborers in the North. This ideological shift was the key to Republican abandonment of Reconstruction, as they chose the protection of their economic and business interests over their desire for racial equality.

According to Professor Michael W. Fitzgerald, at St. Olaf College, it "is an important book" offering a reinterpretation of how the North abandoned freed slaves during reconstruction.

=== The Greatest Nation of the Earth (1997) ===
Richardson's first book, The Greatest Nation of the Earth (1997), stemmed from her dissertation at Harvard University. Inspired by Eric Foner's work on pre-Civil War Republican ideology, Richardson analyzed Republican economic policies during the war. She contended that their efforts to create an activist federal government during the Civil War marked a continuation of Republican free labor ideology. These policies, such as war bonds and greenbacks, as well as the Land-Grant College Act and the Homestead Act, revolutionized the role of the federal government in the U.S. economy. At the same time, these actions laid the groundwork for the Republican Party's shift to big business after the Civil War. James L. Huston found it to be an important assessment, especially of the political economy and economic doctrines of the Republican Party.

== Recognition ==
In 2021, Richardson appeared on the Forbes 50 over 50 list and received the Frances Perkins Center Intelligence and Courage Award. In 2022, USA Today recognized her as one of the Women of the Year. In 2023, The Guardian described her as the single most important progressive pundit since Edward P. Morgan from the 1960s. In 2024, the Authors Guild Foundation awarded her the Baldacci Award for Literary Activism for 2024. In November 2024, Richardson was awarded the Kidger Award by the New England History Teachers Association at the NCSS Conference in Boston, Massachusetts. In July 2025, Richardson was named to the Time100 Creators of 2025 for Letters from an American, which appears on Facebook (3.2 million followers) and Substack (2.5 million subscribers). In 2026, Richardson was selected to receive the 2027 Alice and Clifford Spendlove Prize in Social Justice, Diplomacy and Tolerance from University of California, Merced.

== Personal life ==
In September 2022, Richardson married Buddy Poland, a lobsterman. She has three children from a previous marriage.

She lives in a coastal town in Lincoln County, Maine.

Richardson has described herself as a Lincoln-era Republican, with no affiliation with any political party. She campaigned with Maine's Democratic U.S. Senate candidate Troy Jackson in 2026.
