= Annah May Soule =

American academic

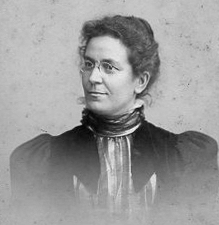
- Annah May Soule, from an 1899 publication.
- Born: September 5, 1859 (some sources give 1861); Port Huron, Michigan
- Died: March 17, 1905; Marion, Ohio
- Years active: 1896–1905

Academic background
- Education: University of Michigan (BL, ML)

Academic work
- Discipline: American history; political economy
- Institutions: Mount Holyoke College
- Notable students: Frances Perkins
- Notable works: The International Boundary of Michigan (1895); The Southern and Western Boundaries of Michigan (1896)

Annah May Soule (September 5, 1859 – March 17, 1905) was a professor of American history and political economy at Mount Holyoke College in Massachusetts.

== Early life ==
Annah May Soule was born in Port Huron, Michigan, and raised in Jackson, Michigan, the daughter of Major Harrison Soule and Mary E. Parker Soule. She had an older sister, Mary Eva Soule Clark (1857–1946). Harrison Soule was an officer in the Union Army during the American Civil War when Annah and her sister were small. After the war, he served as treasurer at the University of Michigan.

Soule trained as a teacher at the state normal school in Ypsilanti, Michigan, then studied law, history, and economics at the University of Michigan, where she earned a bachelor's degree (1894) and a master's degree (1895). Her master's thesis work was published as two monographs, The International Boundary of Michigan (1895) and The Southern and Western Boundaries of Michigan (1896). She also presented on her research at the Michigan Political Science Association meeting in 1896.

== Career ==
Soule taught in Ypsilanti, Michigan, and at the State Normal School at Mankato, Minnesota, as a young woman. She was a professor of American history and political economy at Mount Holyoke College from 1896 until her death in 1905. Her courses were considered innovative in their approach; for example, she assigned students to read The Souls of Black Folk by W. E. B. Du Bois, and to tour a factory and write a report about their findings. One of her students was Frances Perkins, later U.S. Secretary of Labor, who remembered Soule's economic history course as a significant influence. "I think she... opened the door to the idea that... the lack of comfort and security in some people was not solely due to the fact that they drank, which had been the prevailing view in my parental society."

Soule was elected vice president of the New England History Teachers Association in 1901. Her preserved correspondence includes letters from Susan B. Anthony, Woodrow Wilson, and W. E. B. Du Bois.

== Personal life ==
Annah May Soule died in 1905 in Marion, Ohio, in her mid-forties. Her papers, including letters, photographs, and student work, are archived at Mount Holyoke College.
