= List of United States Cabinet members who have served more than eight years =

This is a list of United States Cabinet members who have served for a duration greater than the length of two full presidential terms (this means a minimum of 2,923 days).

== More than eight years in a single cabinet office ==
Secretary	Department	Years of service	Length of service	Presidencies	notes
James Wilson	Agriculture	1897–1913	15 years, 364 days	McKinley, T. Roosevelt, Taft	
Harold Ickes	Interior	1933–1946	12 years, 346 days	F. Roosevelt, Truman	
Albert Gallatin	Treasury	1801–1814	12 years, 270 days	Jefferson, Madison	
Frances Perkins	Labor	1933–1945	12 years, 116 days	F. Roosevelt, Truman	
Tom Vilsack	Agriculture	2009–2017; 2021–2025	First tenure: 7 years, 359 days Second tenure: 3 years, 331 days Total tenure: 11 years, 324 days	Obama, Biden	
Cordell Hull	State	1933–1944	11 years, 271 days	F. Roosevelt	
Henry Morgenthau	Treasury	1934–1945	11 years, 202 days	F. Roosevelt, Truman	
William Wirt	Justice	1817–1829	11 years, 112 days	Monroe, J.Q. Adams	
Andrew Mellon	Treasury	1921–1932	11 years, 8 days	Harding, Coolidge, Hoover	
James Davis	Labor	1921–1930	9 years, 269 days	Harding, Coolidge, Hoover	
William H. Crawford	Treasury	1816–1825	8 years, 135 days	Madison, Monroe, J.Q. Adams	

== More than eight years over multiple cabinet offices ==
Secretary	Office	Began service	Ended service	Length of service	Presidencies
Elaine Chao	Secretary of Labor	January 29, 2001	January 20, 2009	11 years, 341 days	George W. Bush
Elaine Chao	Secretary of Transportation	January 31, 2017	January 11, 2021	11 years, 341 days	Donald Trump
Henry L. Stimson Henry L. Stimson	Secretary of War	May 22, 1911	March 4, 1913	10 years, 342 days	William Howard Taft
Henry L. Stimson Henry L. Stimson	Secretary of War	July 10, 1940	September 21, 1945	10 years, 342 days	Franklin D. Roosevelt and Harry S. Truman
Henry L. Stimson Henry L. Stimson	Secretary of State	March 28, 1929	March 4, 1933	10 years, 342 days	Herbert Hoover
George Shultz	Secretary of Labor	January 22, 1969	July 1, 1970	9 years, 318 days	Richard Nixon
George Shultz	Secretary of the Treasury	June 12, 1972	May 8, 1974	9 years, 318 days	Richard Nixon
George Shultz	Secretary of State	July 16, 1982	January 20, 1989	9 years, 318 days	Ronald Reagan
Levi Woodbury	Secretary of the Navy (Note: Secretary of the Navy was a cabinet-level post until 1947, when the position was put under the Secretary of Defense.)	May 23, 1831	June 30, 1834	9 years, 289 days	Andrew Jackson
Levi Woodbury	Secretary of the Treasury	July 1, 1834	March 4, 1841	9 years, 289 days	Andrew Jackson and Martin Van Buren
Robert Smith	Secretary of the Navy	July 27, 1801	March 4, 1809	9 years, 249 days	Thomas Jefferson
Robert Smith	Secretary of State	March 6, 1809	April 1, 1811	9 years, 249 days	James Madison
William H. Crawford	Secretary of War	August 1, 1815	October 22, 1816	9 years, 220 days	James Madison
William H. Crawford	Secretary of the Treasury	October 22, 1816	March 6, 1825	9 years, 220 days	James Madison, James Monroe, and John Quincy Adams
Caspar Weinberger	Secretary of Health & Human Services	February 12, 1973	August 8, 1975	9 years, 121 days	Richard Nixon and Gerald Ford
Caspar Weinberger	Secretary of Defense	January 21, 1981	November 23, 1987	9 years, 121 days	Ronald Reagan
Henry A. Wallace	Secretary of Agriculture	March 4, 1933	September 4, 1940	9 years, 25 days	Franklin D. Roosevelt
Henry A. Wallace	Secretary of Commerce	March 2, 1945	September 20, 1946	9 years, 25 days	Franklin D. Roosevelt and Harry S. Truman
Lewis Cass	Secretary of War	August 1, 1831	October 4, 1836	8 years, 352 days	Andrew Jackson
Lewis Cass	Secretary of State	March 6, 1857	December 14, 1860	8 years, 352 days	James Buchanan
John C. Calhoun	Secretary of War	December 8, 1817	March 4, 1825	8 years, 66 days	James Monroe
John C. Calhoun	Secretary of State	April 1, 1844	March 10, 1845	8 years, 66 days	John Tyler and James K. Polk
Elihu Root	Secretary of War	August 1, 1899	January 31, 1904	8 years, 13 days	William McKinley and Theodore Roosevelt
Elihu Root	Secretary of State	July 19, 1905	January 27, 1909	8 years, 13 days	Theodore Roosevelt

== Near misses and technicalities ==
Several individuals have come close to the distinction of serving more than 8 years, or greater than 2922 days; only having have missed it by months, weeks, days, or technicality. Listed below are the names of individuals who came within a year of the achievement.

- Orville Freeman missed this distinction by 2 days, having served under Presidents John F. Kennedy and Lyndon B. Johnson as Secretary of Agriculture (1961–1969). Freeman served for 2921 days over these 2 administrations, just under the minimum of 2923 days.
- William L. Marcy missed also this distinction by 2 days, having served under President James K. Polk as Secretary of War (1845–1849), and under Presidents Franklin Pierce and James Buchanan as their Secretary of State (1853–1857). Marcy served for 2921 days over these 3 administrations, just under the minimum of 2923 days.
- David F. Houston missed this distinction by 3 days, having served under President Woodrow Wilson as Secretary of Agriculture (1913–1920) and then as Secretary of the Treasury (1920–1921). Houston served for 2920 days, which is exactly 8 regular years (not accounting for leap days), leaving him just short of 2923 day minimum.
- William P. Rogers served for 2872 days in a cabinet office, 51 days short. Rogers served first under President Dwight Eisenhower as Attorney General (1957–1961) and then later under Richard Nixon as Secretary of State.
- Richard Rush served for 2832 days in a cabinet office, 91 days short. Rush first served under James Madison and then James Monroe as their Attorney General (1814–1817). Rush also simultaneously served as acting Secretary of State for 197 days under Monroe. Rush later returned to the cabinet under John Quincy Adams as his Secretary of the Treasury (1825–1829). If his simultaneous tenure as acting Secretary of State was counted in addition, Rush would technically be included in the above list.
