= Frances Perkins =

American workers' rights advocate (1880–1965)

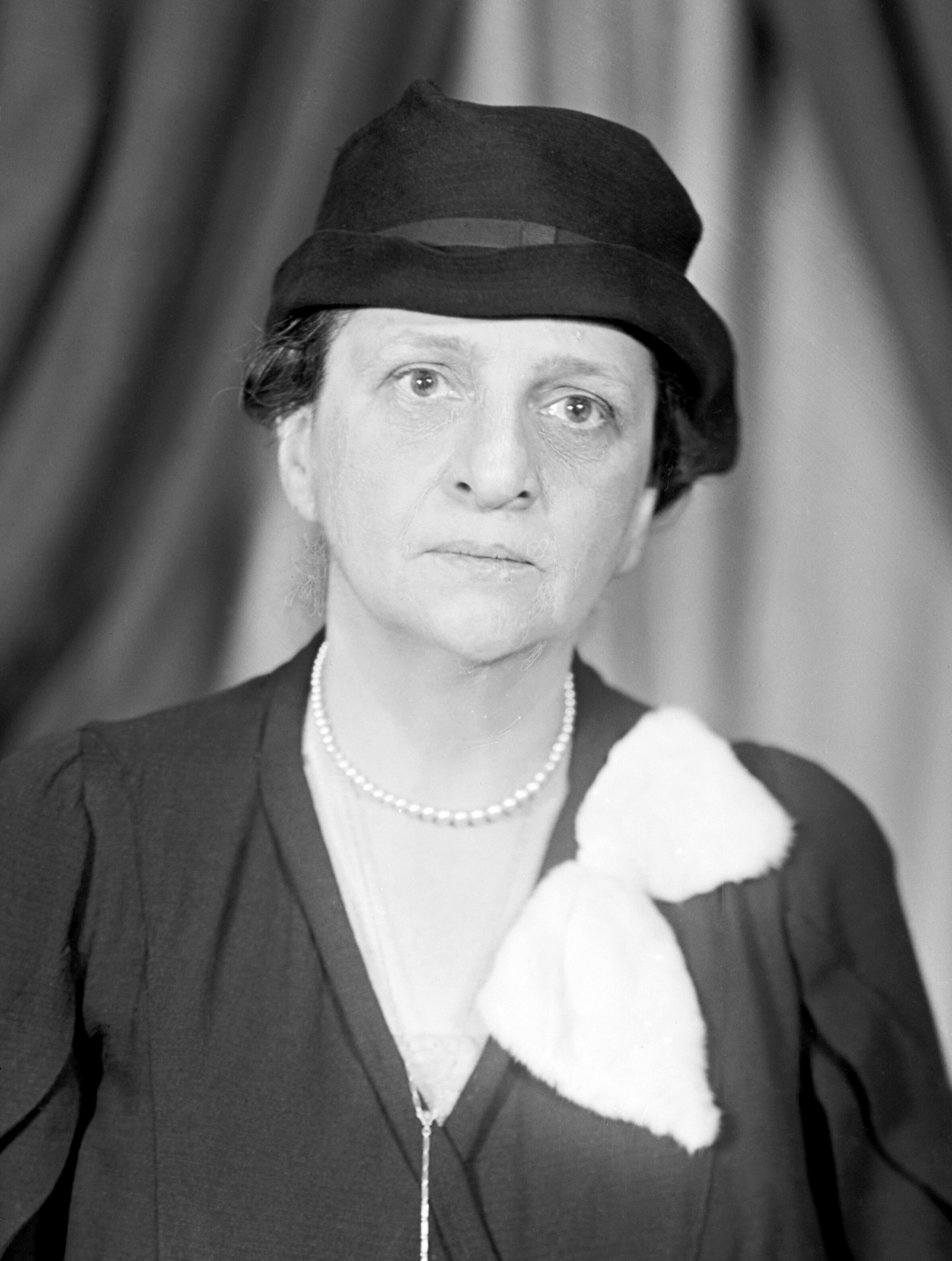
- Perkins, 1905–1945

4th United States Secretary of Labor
- In office March 4, 1933 – June 30, 1945
- President: Franklin D. Roosevelt; Harry S. Truman
- Preceded by: William N. Doak
- Succeeded by: Lewis B. Schwellenbach

Industrial Commissioner of New York
- In office January 14, 1929 – December 31, 1932
- Governor: Franklin D. Roosevelt
- Preceded by: Position established
- Succeeded by: Elmer Andrews

Personal details
- Born: Fannie Coralie Perkins; April 10, 1880 Boston, Massachusetts, U.S.
- Died: May 14, 1965 (aged 85) New York City, U.S.
- Party: Socialist (1907–1912); Independent (1912–1919); Democratic (1919–1965)
- Spouse: Paul Wilson (m. 1913; died 1952)
- Children: 1
- Education: Mount Holyoke College (BS); University of Pennsylvania (attended); Columbia University (MA)

Frances Perkins (born Fannie Coralie Perkins; April 10, 1880 – May 14, 1965) was an American workers-rights advocate who served as the fourth United States secretary of labor from 1933 to 1945, the longest serving in that position. A member of the Democratic Party, Perkins was the first woman ever to serve in a presidential cabinet. As a loyal supporter of her longtime friend, President Franklin D. Roosevelt, she helped make labor issues important in the emerging New Deal coalition. She advocated for immigrants’ rights as well. She was one of two Roosevelt cabinet members to remain in office for his entire presidency (the other being Interior Secretary Harold L. Ickes).

Perkins's most important role came in developing a policy for social security in 1935. She also helped form government policy for working with labor unions. Perkins's Labor Department helped to mediate strikes by way of the United States Conciliation Service. She dealt with numerous labor issues during World War II, when skilled labor was vital to the economy and women were moving into jobs formerly held by men.

Perkins was born in Boston. After graduating from Mount Holyoke College, she briefly worked as a teacher and at the Hull House settlement in Chicago. She obtained graduate degrees at Columbia University and became a labor leader and consumer advocate in New York City, where she first met Roosevelt in 1910. Perkins was appointed a commissioner in New York City government and later in the state government. On January 14, 1929, Perkins was appointed the head of New York's Department of Labor, in the role of Industrial Commissioner, by Roosevelt when he was governor of New York. She addressed the early effects of the Great Depression in this role. When Roosevelt was elected president in 1932, Perkins was asked to join his cabinet and she presented him with a list of programs to help workers. She oversaw many New Deal programs during the Depression and labor programs during World War II. The Frances Perkins Building, headquarters of the U.S. Labor Department, is named for her, and she is remembered with a feast day in the Episcopal Church.

== Early life ==
Fannie Coralie Perkins was born in Boston, Massachusetts, to Susan Ella Perkins (née Bean; 1849–1927) and Frederick William Perkins (1844–1916), the owner of a stationer's business (both of her parents originally were from Maine). Fannie Perkins had one sister, Ethel Perkins Harrington (1884–1965). Frances Perkins was raised in a middle class Republican family. She descended from a long line of Maine farmers and craftsmen. In 1905 she changed her name to Frances Perkins. The family could trace their roots to colonial America, and the women had a tradition of work in education. She spent much of her childhood in Worcester, Massachusetts. Frederick loved Greek literature and passed that love on to Fannie.

Perkins attended the Classical High School in Worcester. She earned a bachelor's degree in chemistry and physics from Mount Holyoke College in 1902. While attending Mount Holyoke, Perkins discovered progressive politics and the suffrage movement. She was named class president. One of her professors was Annah May Soule, who assigned students to tour a factory to study working conditions; Perkins recalled Soule's course as an important influence.

== Early career and continuing education ==
After graduating from High school she taught in Chicago and helped collect wages for workers. After college, Perkins held a variety of teaching positions, including one from 1904 to 1906 where she taught chemistry at Ferry Hall School (now Lake Forest Academy), an all-girls school in Lake Forest, Illinois.[11] In Chicago, she volunteered at settlement houses, including Hull House, where she worked with Jane Addams. She changed her name from Fannie to Frances when she joined the Episcopal church in 1905. In 1907, she moved to Philadelphia and enrolled at University of Pennsylvania's Wharton School to learn economics, and spent two years in the city working as a social worker. During this time, she joined the Socialist Party of America, but left after a few years as she felt the party was too idealistic. Shortly after, she moved to Greenwich Village, New York, where she attended Columbia University and became active in the suffrage movement. In support of the movement, Perkins attended protests and meetings, and advocated for the cause on street corners. She earned a master's degree in economics and sociology from Columbia in 1910.

In 1910 Perkins achieved statewide prominence as head of the New York office of the National Consumers League and lobbied with vigor for better working hours and conditions. She also taught as a professor of sociology at Adelphi College. The next year, she witnessed the tragic Triangle Shirtwaist Factory fire, a pivotal event in her life. The factory employed hundreds of workers, mostly young women, but lacked fire escapes. In addition, the owner kept all the doors and stairwells locked in order to prevent employees from taking breaks. When the building caught fire, many workers tried unsuccessfully to escape through the windows. Just a year before, these same women and girls had fought for the 54-hour work week and other benefits that Perkins had championed. One hundred and forty-six workers died. Perkins blamed lax legislation for the loss.

As a consequence of this fire, Perkins left her position at the New York office of the National Consumers League and, on the recommendation of Theodore Roosevelt, became the executive secretary for the Committee on Safety of the City of New York, formed to improve fire safety. As part of the Committee on Safety, Perkins investigated another significant fire at the Freeman plant in Binghamton, New York, in which 63 people died. In 1912, she was instrumental in getting the New York legislature to pass a "54-hour" bill that capped the number of hours women and children could work. Perkins pressed for votes for the legislation, encouraging proponents including Franklin D. Roosevelt to filibuster, while Perkins called state senators to make sure they could be present for the final vote.

== Marriage and personal life ==
In 1913, Perkins married New York economist Paul Caldwell Wilson. She kept her maiden name because she did not want her activities in Albany and New York City to affect the career of her husband, then the secretary to the New York City mayor. She defended her right to keep her maiden name in court. The couple had a daughter, Susanna, born in December 1916. Less than two years later, Wilson began to show signs of mental illness. He would be institutionalized frequently for mental illness throughout the remainder of their marriage. Perkins had cut back slightly on her public life following the birth of her daughter, but returned after her husband's illness to provide for her family. According to biographer Kirstin Downey, Susanna displayed "manic-depressive symptoms", as well. Perkins shared the Georgetown, D.C., home of an old friend, Mary Harriman Rumsey, who had founded the Junior League in 1901, for less than 17 months, until Rumsey's death in 1934. Rumsey and Perkins's arrangement was for practical reasons, as a December 1933 Washington Post columnist had criticized Perkins for not meeting social obligations, due to her apartment accommodations. Later Perkins shared a home with Caroline O’Day, a Democratic congresswoman from New York. During this time, Perkins also switched her party affiliation from the Republican to the Democratic Party.

== Return to work in New York ==
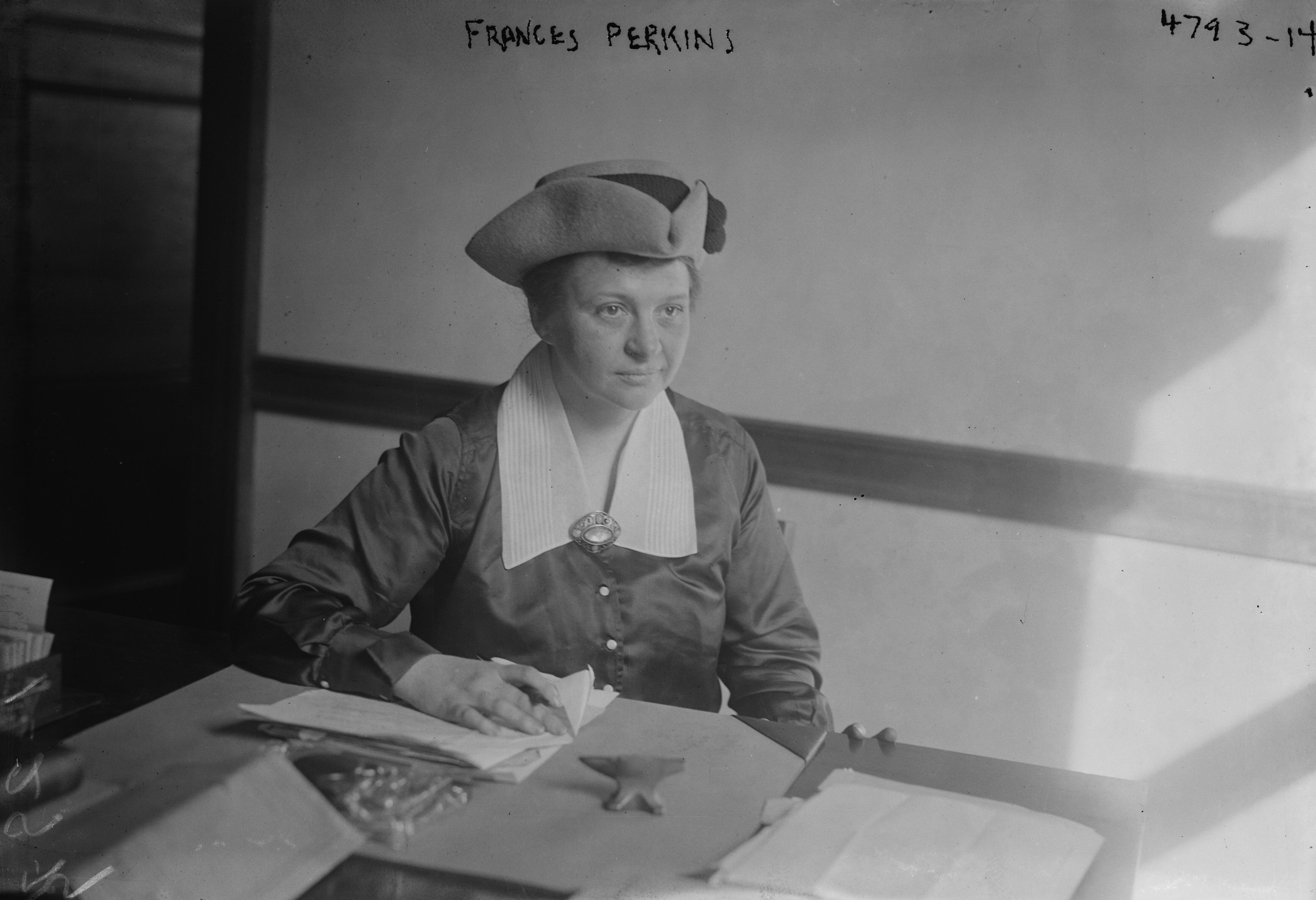
Perkins at her desk c. 1919

Prior to moving to Washington, D.C., Perkins held various positions in the New York state government, having gained respect from the political leaders in the state. When Perkins returned in 1917 to New York when she was the first female member of the New York state she was highly ranked, especially for a female at this time. Under Governors Al Smith and later Franklin D Roosevelt she helped organize factory inspections, settled strikes and most importantly established a reputation as one of the nation’s leading experts of labor relations.

In 1919, she was appointed to the Industrial Commission of the State of New York by Governor Al Smith. Her nomination was met with protests from both manufacturers and labor, neither of whom felt Perkins represented their interests. Smith stood by Perkins as someone who could be a voice for women and girls in the workforce and for her work on the Wagner Factory Investigating Committee. Although claiming the delay in Perkins's confirmation was not due to her gender, some state senators pointed to Perkins's not taking her husband's name as a sign that she was a radical. Perkins was confirmed on February 18, 1919, becoming one of the first female commissioners in New York, and began working out of New York City. The state senate-confirmed position made Perkins one of three commissioners overseeing the industrial code, and the supervisor of both the bureau of information and statistics and the bureau of mediation and arbitration. The position also came with an $8,000 salary (equivalent to $149,000 in 2025), making Perkins the highest-paid woman in New York state government. Six months into her job, her fellow Commissioner James M. Lynch called Perkins's contributions "invaluable," and added "[f]rom the work which Miss Perkins has accomplished I am convinced that more women ought to be placed in high positions throughout the state departments."

In 1929, the newly elected New York governor, Franklin Delano Roosevelt, appointed Perkins as the inaugural New York state industrial commissioner. As commissioner, Perkins supervised an agency with 1,800 employees.

Having earned the co-operation and the respect of various political factions, Perkins helped put New York in the forefront of progressive reform. She expanded factory investigations, reduced the workweek for women to 48 hours, and championed minimum wage and unemployment insurance laws. She worked vigorously to put an end to child labor and to provide safety for women workers.

== Secretary of Labor ==
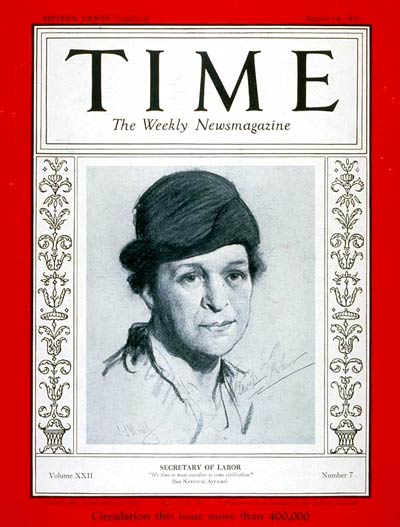
Secretary of Labor Perkins on the cover of Time (August 14, 1933)

In 1933, Roosevelt summoned Perkins to ask her to join his cabinet. When Frances Perkins was appointed Secretary of Labor in 1933, there were male workers at the Department of Labor who were planning to quit their jobs since they refused to work under a woman. Perkins presented Roosevelt with a long list of labor programs for which she would fight, from Social Security to minimum wage. "Nothing like this has ever been done in the United States before," she told Roosevelt. "You know that, don’t you?" Agreeing to back her, Roosevelt nominated Perkins as Secretary of Labor. The nomination was met with support from the National League of Women Voters and the Women's Party. The American Federation of Labor criticized the selection of Perkins because of a perceived lack of ties to labor.

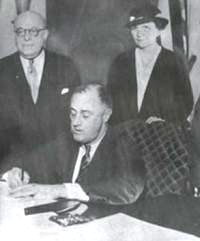
Congressman Theodore Peyser and Perkins stand behind President Roosevelt as he signs the Wagner-Peyser Act (June 6, 1933)

As secretary, Perkins oversaw the Department of Labor. Perkins went on to hold the position for 12 years, longer than any other secretary of labor and the fourth longest of any cabinet secretary. She also became the first woman to hold a cabinet position in the United States, thus she became the first woman to enter the presidential line of succession. The selection of a woman to the cabinet had been rumored in the four previous administrations, with Roosevelt being the first to follow through. Roosevelt had witnessed Perkins's work firsthand during their time in Albany. With few exceptions, President Roosevelt consistently supported the goals and programs of Secretary Perkins.

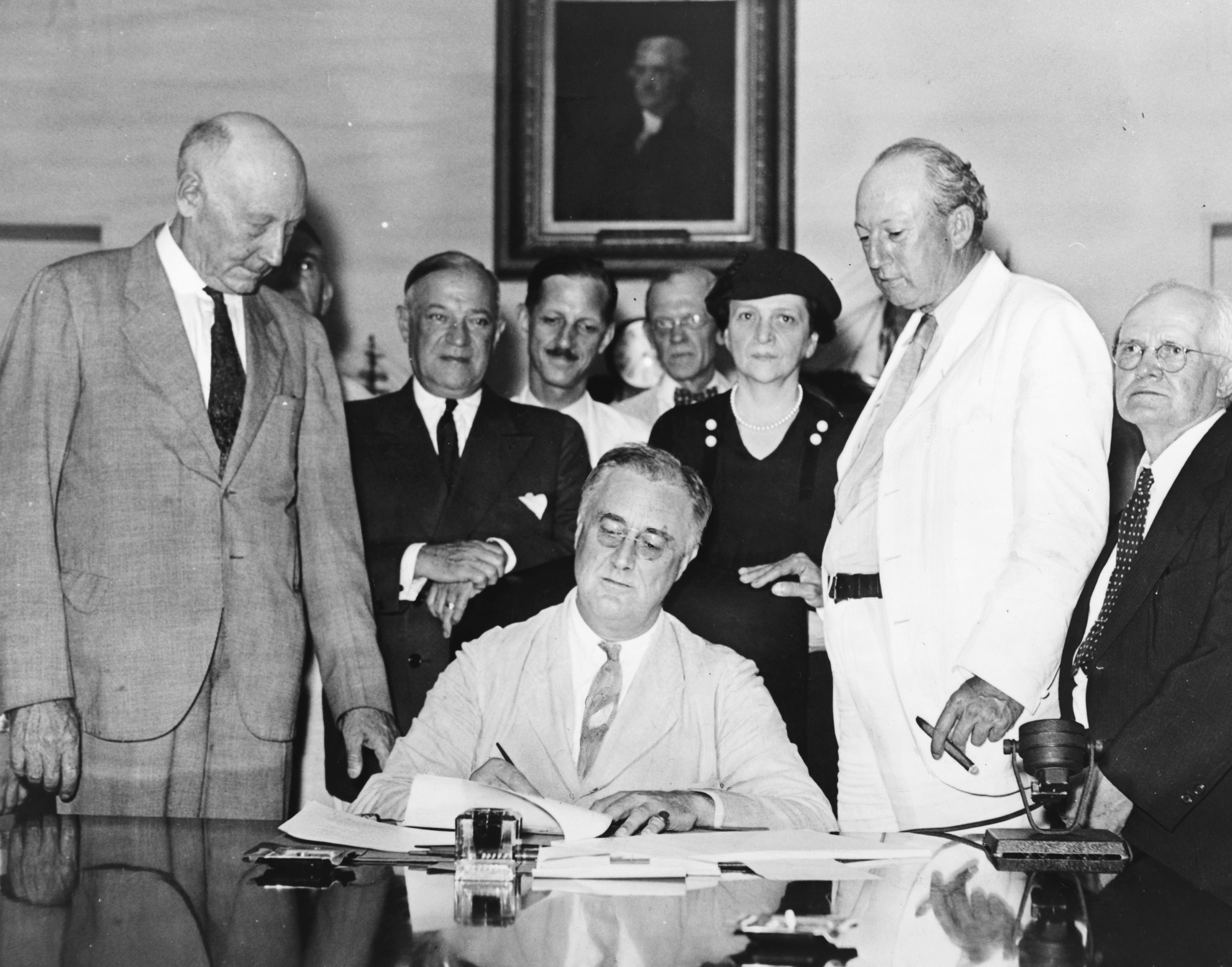
President Roosevelt signing the Social Security Act into law on August 14, 1935, with Perkins among those witnessing the signing (third from right)

Perkins was “the central architect of the New Deal” and played a major role in its development by formulating policy, guiding legislation, and directing implementation. As chair of the President's Committee on Economic Security, she was involved in all aspects of its advisory reports, including the Civilian Conservation Corps and the She-She-She Camps. Her most important contribution was to help design the Social Security Act of 1935; her role as chair of the Committee prepared the groundwork for what would ultimately become a landmark piece of legislation.

Perkins created the Immigration and Naturalization Service. She sought to implement liberal immigration policies but some of her efforts experienced pushback, especially in Congress. Her goal to humanize the treatment of immigrants in the U.S. nonetheless led to some noteworthy successes in standing up against restrictive immigration practices, abolishing, for instance, the Bureau of Immigration’s “Section 24” squad, known for their illegal apprehension tactics which violated due process.

Perkins went to Geneva between June 11 and 18, 1938. On June 13, she gave a speech at the International Labour Organization in which she called on the organization to make its contribution to the world economic recovery, while avoiding being dragged into political problems. She also defended the participation of the United States in the ILO, which it had joined in 1934. (Note: The Recording of this speech (in English) of June 13, 1938 was digitized by the genevaMonde.ch)

In 1939, she came under fire from some members of Congress for refusing to deport the leader of the West Coast International Longshore and Warehouse Union, Harry Bridges, for allegedly being a member of the Communist Party. Ultimately, Bridges was vindicated by the Supreme Court.

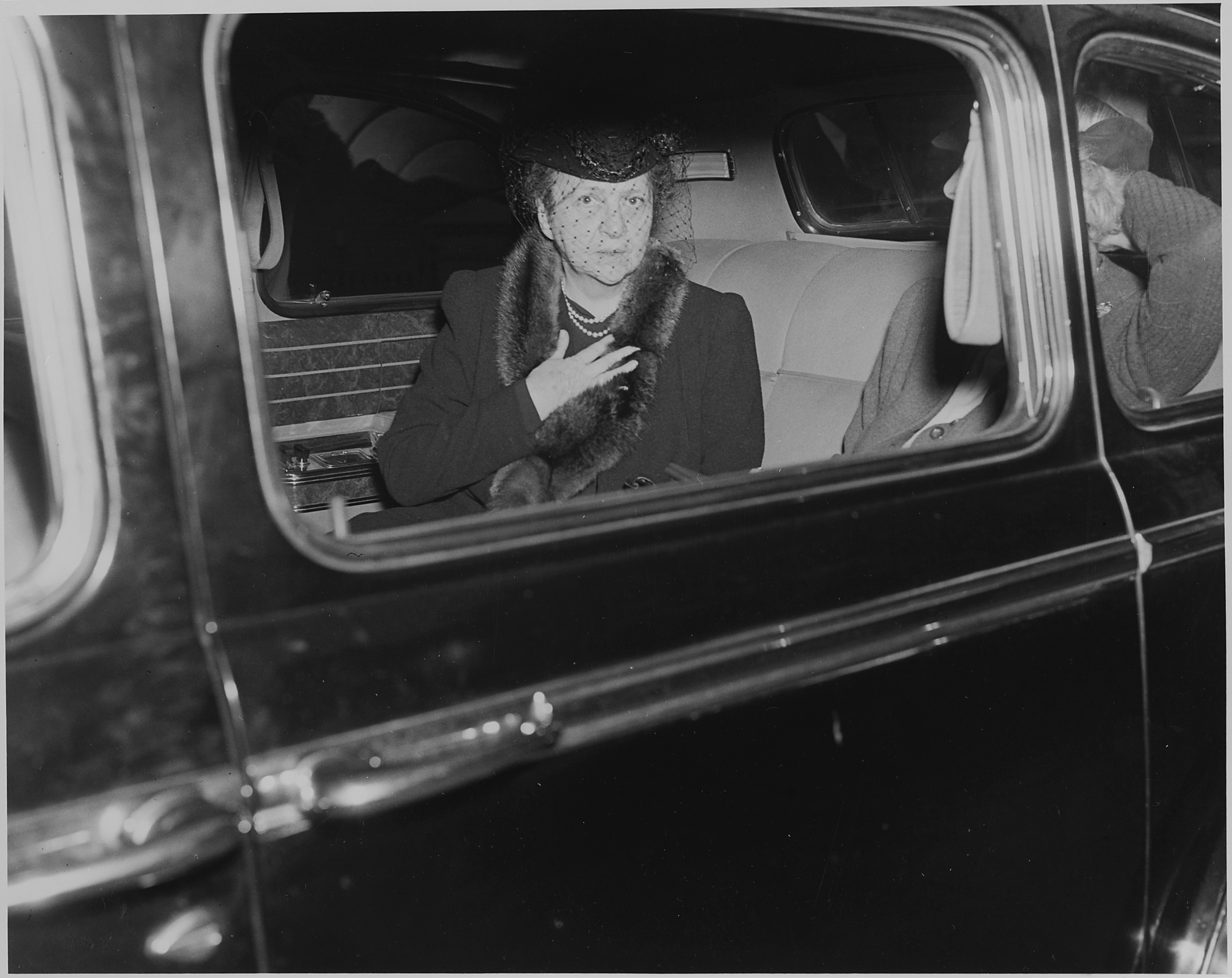
Perkins at the White House shortly after President Roosevelt's death, April 12, 1945

After the death of President Roosevelt in April 1945, Harry Truman replaced the Roosevelt cabinet, naming Lewis B. Schwellenbach as Secretary of Labor. Perkins's tenure as secretary ended on June 30, 1945, with the swearing in of Schwellenbach.

== Later life ==
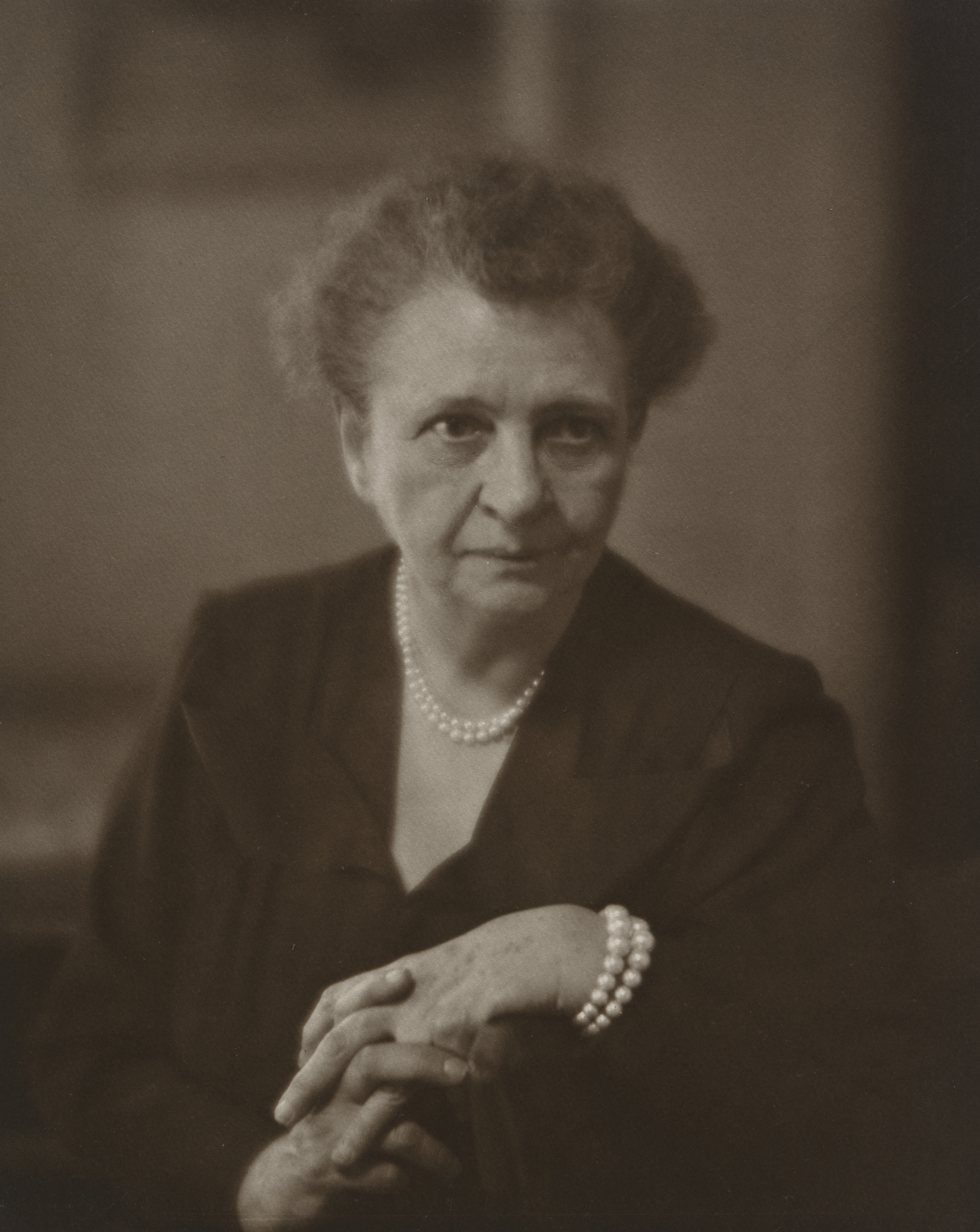
Portrait by Clara Sipprell, 1952

Following her tenure as Secretary of Labor, in 1945, Perkins was asked by President Truman to serve on the United States Civil Service Commission, which she accepted. In her post as commissioner, Perkins spoke out against government officials requiring secretaries and stenographers to be physically attractive, blaming the practice for the shortage of secretaries and stenographers in the government. Perkins left the Civil Service Commission in 1952 when her husband died. During this period, she also published a memoir of her time in the Roosevelt administration entitled, The Roosevelt I Knew (1946, ISBN 9780143106418), which covered her personal history with Franklin Roosevelt, starting from their meeting in 1910.

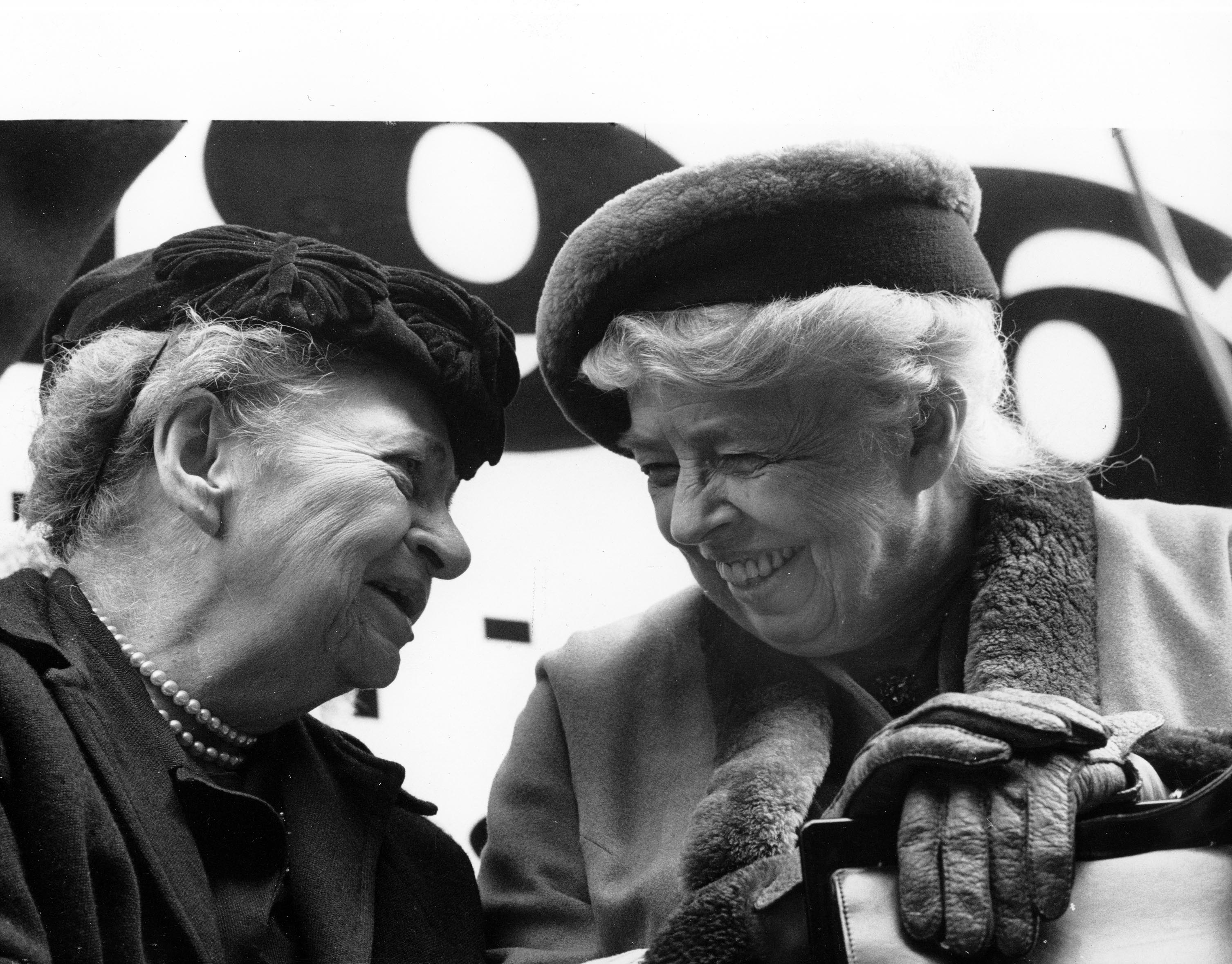
Perkins (left) with Eleanor Roosevelt at the 50th anniversary commemoration of the Triangle Shirtwaist Factory Fire, March 1961

Following her government service career, Perkins remained active and returned to educational positions at colleges and universities. She was a teacher and lecturer at the New York State School of Industrial and Labor Relations at Cornell University until her death in 1965, at age 85. She also gave guest lectures at other universities, including two 15-lecture series at the University of Illinois Institute of Labor and Industrial relations in 1955 and 1958.

At Cornell, she lived at the Telluride House where she was one of the first women to become a member of that renowned intellectual community. Kirstin Downey, author of The Woman Behind the New Deal: The Life of Frances Perkins, FDR's Secretary of Labor and His Moral Conscience, dubbed her time at the Telluride House "probably the happiest phase of her life".

Perkins is buried in the Glidden Cemetery in Newcastle, Maine. She was also known locally as "Mrs. Paul Wilson" and is buried by that name.

== Legacy ==
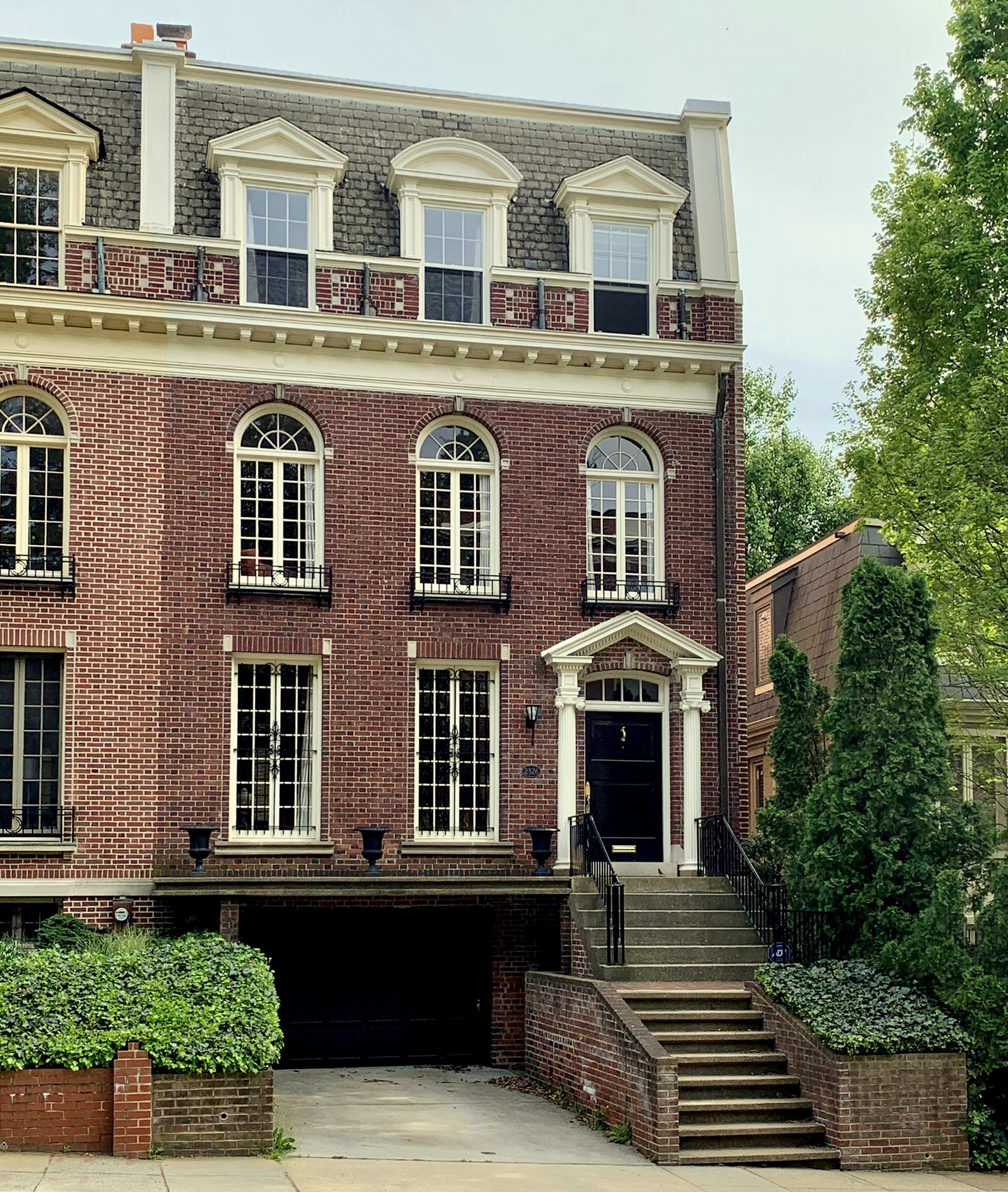
The Frances Perkins House, a U.S. National Historic Landmark since 1991, in Washington, D.C.

Perkins is famous for being the first woman cabinet member, as well as from her policy accomplishments. She was heavily involved with many issues associated with the social safety net including the creation of Social Security, unemployment insurance in the United States, the federal minimum wage, and federal laws regulating child labor.

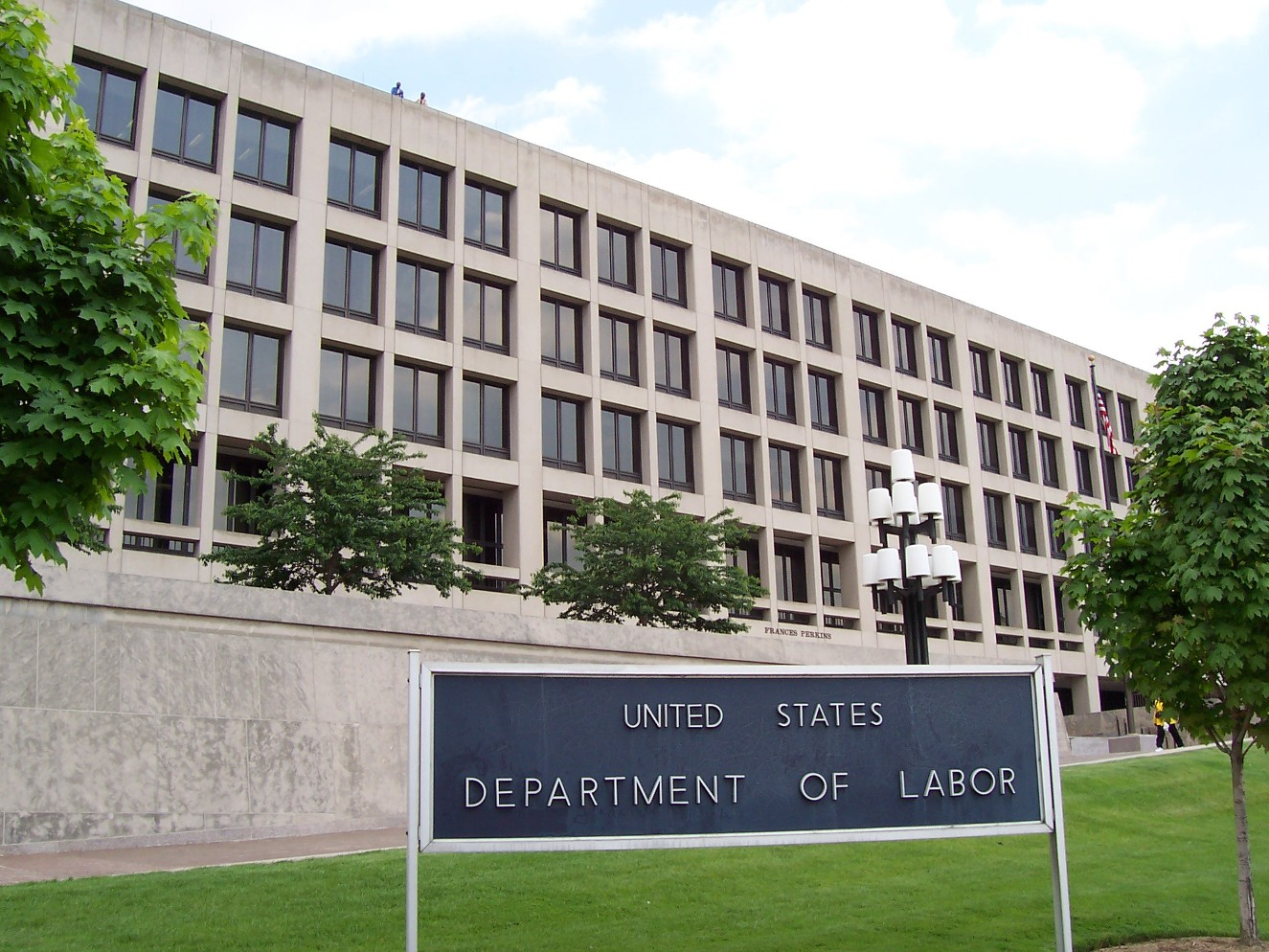
The Frances Perkins Building is the Washington, D.C. headquarters of the United States Department of Labor and is located at 200 Constitution Avenue NW and runs alongside Interstate 395.

Frances Perkins championed the rights of immigrants. In her role as cabinet secretary, she facilitated the immigration of thousands of Jews to the U.S. from Germany and other European nations who were escaping Nazi persecution in the 1930s—including hundreds of Jewish children in collaboration with German Jewish Children's Aid—all in the face of American antisemitism and a restrictive immigration system.

In 1967, the Telluride House and Cornell University's School of Industrial and Labor Relations established the Frances Perkins Memorial Fellowship. In 1982, Perkins was inducted into the National Women's Hall of Fame. In 2015, Perkins was named by Equality Forum as one of their 31 Icons of the 2015 LGBT History Month. In 2019, she was announced as among the members of the inaugural class of the Government Hall of Fame. Also that year, Elizabeth Warren used a podium built with wood salvaged from the Perkins Homestead. That same year, Time created 89 new covers to celebrate women of the year starting from 1920; it chose Perkins for 1933.

Perkins remains a prominent alumna of Mount Holyoke College, whose Frances Perkins Program allows "women of non-traditional age" (i.e., age 24 or older) to complete a bachelor of arts degree. There are approximately 140 Frances Perkins scholars each year.

=== Character in historical context ===
Perkins’s leadership has had a deep impact on women’s history in the United States by paving the way for women as they assume powerful roles in government. As the first woman to become a member of the presidential cabinet, Perkins had to adapt to the expectations of that role by demonstrating competence, professionalism, and political skill in a male-dominated field in order to set the precedent for women in government.

Perkins had a cool personality that held her aloof from the crowd. On one occasion, however, she engaged in some heated name-calling with Alfred P. Sloan, the chairman of the board at General Motors. During a punishing United Auto Workers strike, she phoned Sloan in the middle of the night and called him a scoundrel and a skunk for not meeting the union's demands. She said, "You don't deserve to be counted among decent men. You'll go to hell when you die." Sloan's late-night response was one of irate indignation.

=== Memorials and monuments ===
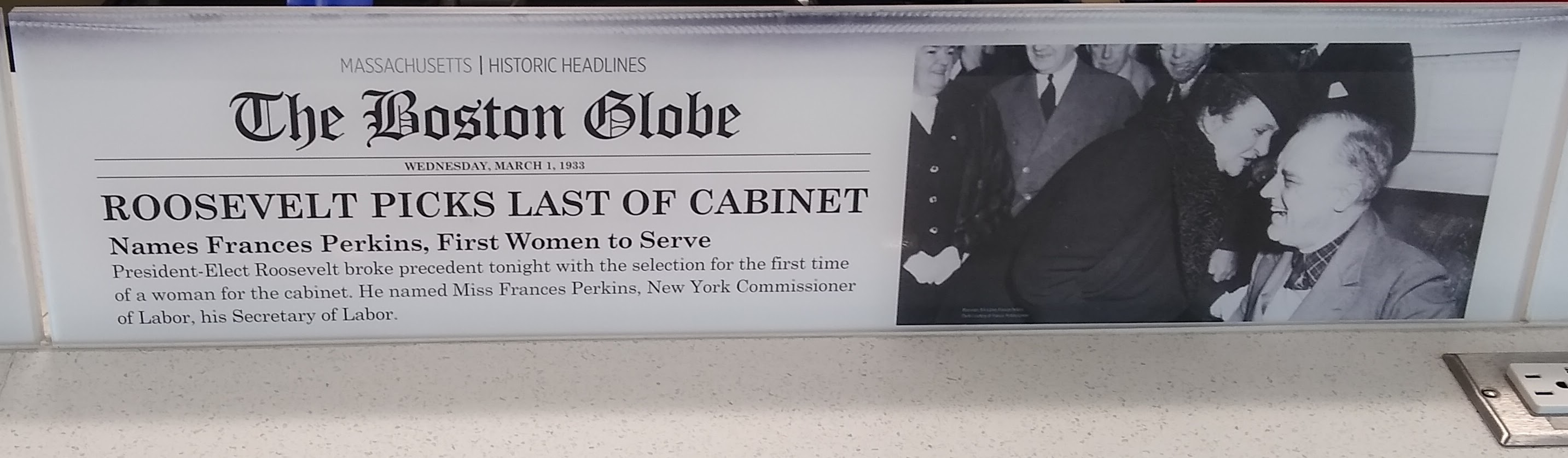
A plaque honoring Perkins at Boston's Logan Airport

President Jimmy Carter renamed the headquarters of the U.S. Department of Labor in Washington, D.C., the Frances Perkins Building in 1980. Perkins was honored with a postage stamp that same year. Her home in Washington, D.C. from 1937 to 1940, and her Maine family home are both designated National Historic Landmarks.

The Frances Perkins Center is a nonprofit organization located at the Frances Perkins Homestead in Newcastle, Maine, which was designated as a National Historic Landmark in 2014. In December 2024, the site was named a National Monument by President Joe Biden.

On April 10, 2003, a historical marker honoring Perkins was dedicated in Homestead, Pennsylvania, at the southwest corner of 9th and Amity.

On October 30, 2024, a plaque honoring Perkins was unveiled at 121 Washington Place in Greenwich Village, where Perkins once lived.

==== Maine Department of Labor mural ====
A mural depicting Perkins was displayed in the Maine Department of Labor headquarters, the native state of her parents. On March 23, 2011, Maine's Republican governor, Paul LePage, ordered the mural removed. A spokesperson for the governor said he received complaints about the mural from state business officials and an "anonymous" fax charging that it was reminiscent of "communist North Korea where they use these murals to brainwash the masses". LePage also ordered that the names of seven conference rooms in the state department of labor be changed, including one named after Perkins. A lawsuit was filed in U.S. District Court seeking "to confirm the mural's current location, ensure that the artwork is adequately preserved, and ultimately to restore it to the Department of Labor's lobby in Augusta".

As of January 2013, the mural resides in the Maine State Museum, at the entrance to the Maine State Library and Maine State Archives.

During an election debate, when asked who should be added to a theoretical Mt. Rushmore honoring Mainers, candidate Troy Jackson proposed Frances Perkins.

=== Veneration ===
In 2022, Frances Perkins was officially added to the Episcopal Church liturgical calendar with a feast day on 13 May.

=== In popular culture ===
Perkins is a minor character in the 1977 Broadway musical Annie, in which she, alongside Harold Ickes, is ordered by Roosevelt to sing along to the song "Tomorrow" with the title character. It is during this scene in the show that Roosevelt's cabinet comes up with the idea of the New Deal.

In the 1987 American movie Dirty Dancing, the lead character Frances "Baby" Houseman reveals that she was named after Perkins.

David Brooks's 2015 book The Road to Character includes an extensive chapter biography of Perkins.

Becoming Madam Secretary is a 2024 historical novel by Stephanie Dray based on Perkins’s life.

On September 29, 2026, Comedy Central aired an episode titled, FDR's Labor Secretary Francis Perkins on its series Drunk History, starring Lisa Gilroy and Mae Whitman.

== See also ==
- List of female United States Cabinet members
- List of United States Cabinet members who have served more than eight years
- Silicosis

== Notes ==
Political offices
| Preceded by William Doak | United States Secretary of Labor; 1933–1945 | Succeeded by Lewis Schwellenbach |
