= Frances Perkins National Monument =

Historic house in Maine, United States

- Perkins Homestead
- U.S. National Register of Historic Places
- U.S. National Historic Landmark
- U.S. National Monument
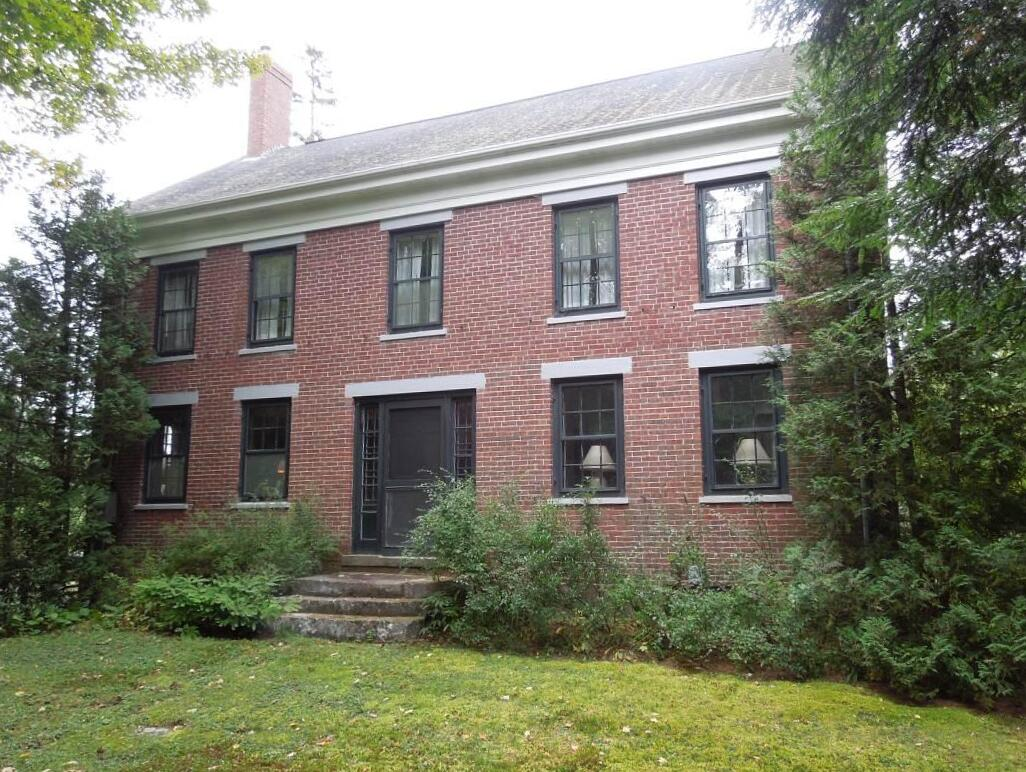
- National Park Service photo of the 1837 Brick House, 2012

- Location within Maine
- Location: 478 River Rd., Newcastle, Maine
- Coordinates: 44°0′19″N 69°33′27″W
- Area: 57 acres (23 ha)
- Built: 1837
- Website: https://www.nps.gov/frpe
- NRHP reference No.: 14000919

Significant dates
- Added to NRHP: August 25, 2014
- Designated NHL: August 25, 2014
- Designated NMON: December 16, 2024

Frances Perkins National Monument is a historic site that preserves the Perkins Homestead (also known as the Brick House), a homestead at 478 River Road in Newcastle, Maine, United States. The 57-acre (23 ha) property, including its 1837 brick farmhouse, was designated a National Historic Landmark and a national monument for its association with the life of Frances Perkins (1880–1965), the first woman to hold a position in the United States Cabinet, who spent many years at the property, as a child and in her later years. The property was first listed on the National Register of Historic Places in 2009 as the Brick House Historic District.

== Description and history ==
The Perkins Homestead occupies 57 acres (23 ha) of land on the east side of River Road, about 2 miles (3.2 km) south of the center of Newcastle, Maine. The roughly rectangular property slopes from the road down to the Damariscotta River, which like the road runs generally north–south. The westernmost part of the property includes all of its buildings, a walled garden, and a tract of historic farmland just north of the building complex. The central portion of the property is forested, with paths lined by stone walls leading to agricultural fields in the plain adjacent to the river. The easternmost area, in addition to these agricultural fields, includes the remains of several other Perkins family residences, and the remains of a brickmaking operation. This area also includes the archaeological remains of an 18th-century garrison house. The homestead complex consists of a brick two-story house, built in 1837, which is connected by a series of additions to a barn that was originally freestanding. A short way east of the barn is a small late-19th century outbuilding, which has seen a variety of uses, including as a chicken house and art studio.

The property was owned by the Perkins family for hundreds of years. Though spending most of her childhood in Worcester, Frances Perkins spent summers with her grandmother on the property, and it was her home in the later years of her life. Members of her immediate family are buried in the family cemetery, which is on the property. Perkins, born in 1880, was educated at Mount Holyoke College and was working as a social worker in New York City when the Triangle Shirtwaist Factory fire occurred in 1911. Perkins's profile was raised by her leadership in advocating for changes to fire codes in the aftermath of the blaze, which killed 146 workers. Perkins was appointed Secretary of Labor by President Franklin Delano Roosevelt in 1933, a time when the country was suffering great unemployment in the Great Depression. Perkins was responsible for seeing through legislative enactment of significant labor reforms, including the 40-hour work week, bans on child labor, and unemployment and worker compensation programs.

Perkins regularly spent summers at the Maine homestead, and she inherited it with her sister in 1927. She was its primary resident and caretaker until her death in 1965. The property was first listed on the National Register of Historic Places as the Brick House Historic District for its pre-20th century historical and archaeological importance in 2009, and it was designated a National Historic Landmark for its association with Perkins in 2014. In 2020, the property was purchased by the Frances Perkins Center, a nonprofit dedicated to inspiring current and future generations to understand and uphold the government’s role in providing social justice and economic security for all.

Secretary of the Interior Deb Haaland visited the Homestead in August 2024 while advocates and the Perkins Center called for the site to be designated a national monument. In an event at the Frances Perkins Building in Washington, D.C., President Joe Biden established Frances Perkins National Monument on December 16, 2024, after the core area of the homestead including the Brick House and barn (2.3 acres) was donated to the National Park Service.

== See also ==
- Frances Perkins House, her home in Washington DC, also a national historic landmark
- List of National Historic Landmarks in Maine
- National Register of Historic Places listings in Lincoln County, Maine
- List of national monuments of the United States
