= Frances Perkins Center =

The Frances Perkins Center is a nonprofit organization located in Newcastle, Maine. Its mission is to inspire current and future generations to understand and uphold the government's role in providing social justice and economic security for all, based on the vision of workers’ rights advocate Frances Perkins.

The Center is located at the Frances Perkins National Monument in Newcastle, which was initially designated a National Historic Landmark in 2014. Its house and connected farm buildings are owned by the Center.

== History ==
The Frances Perkins Homestead National Historic Landmark has been owned and managed by the Center since 2020. It includes 57 acres of woods and fields along the Damariscotta River, and an 1837 brick house listed in the National Register of Historic Places and designated a National Historic Landmark in 2014. The site was home to generations of the Perkins family dating back to the 1750s.

In 2023, the Center completed a $3.5 million renovation project, protecting the farmhouse and other structures from deterioration. That same year, it hosted an awards ceremony to celebrate the Center's reopening for public visitation.

In June 2024, the Center was awarded a $750,000 grant by the Mellon Foundation. It became the first organization in Maine to receive funds from the Mellon Foundation's grant program. Distributed over three years, the grant money is meant to advance the Center's mission of historic preservation, enhance educational programming, and support staffing.

The Center hosts a self-guided exhibit dedicated to Perkins’ life and work. Open seasonally, it displays artifacts, photographs, and other items to tell Perkins’ story.

In August 2024, the Center sought support for designating Perkins' home as a national monument. The organization claimed the designation would "shine a brighter light on the so-called only woman in the room."

In December 2024, the Biden administration designated the 57-acre rural homestead (where the Center is located) as the Frances Perkins National Monument.

== Leadership ==
The Center's executive director is Amanda Hatch, who succeeded Giovanna Gray Lockhart.
