= List of Kamala Harris 2024 presidential campaign congressional legislators endorsements =

This is a list of notable congressional legislators that endorsed the Kamala Harris 2024 presidential campaign.

== U.S. senators ==
48 of the 51 incumbent members of the Senate Democratic Caucus endorsed Harris.

=== Current ===
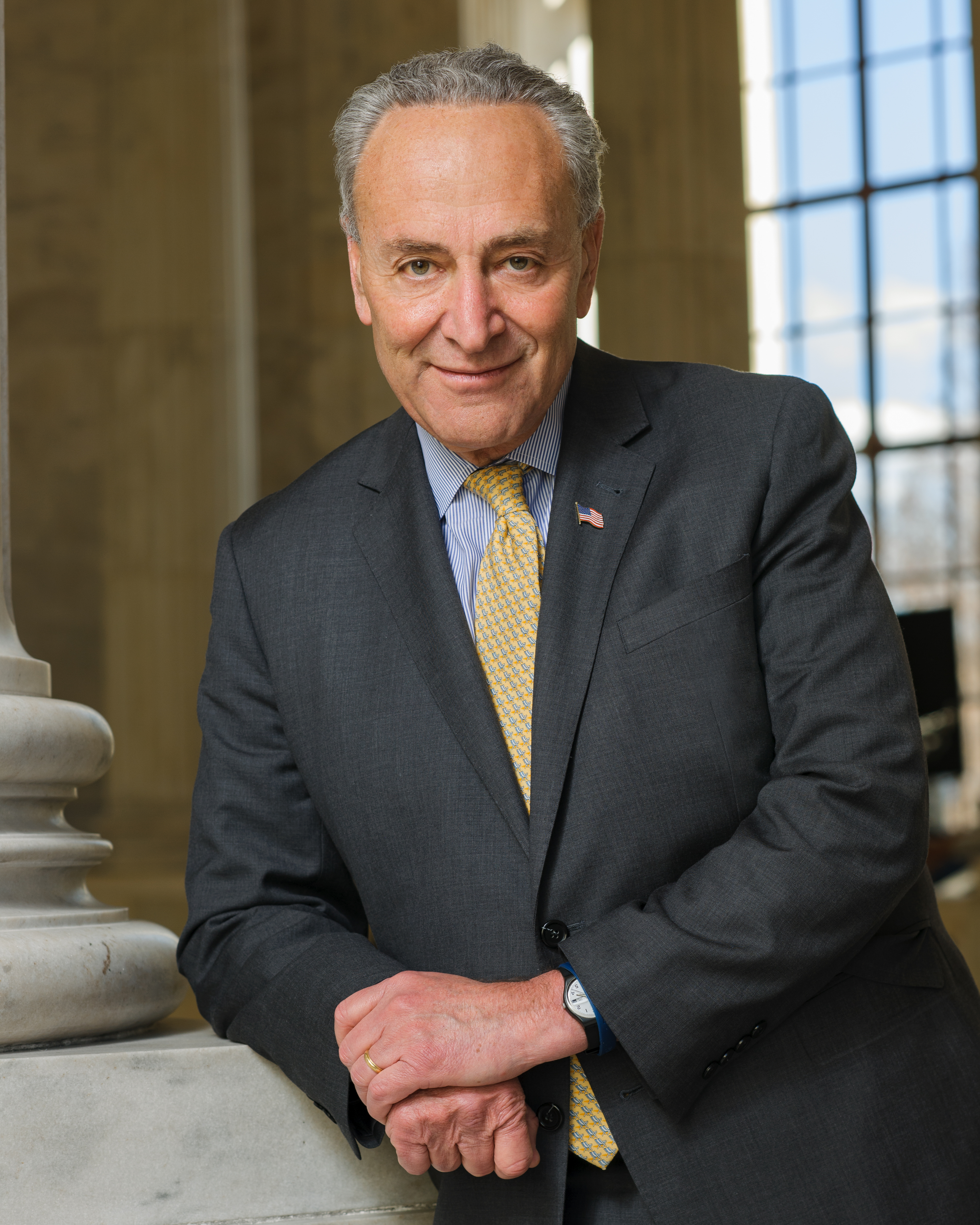
Chuck Schumer

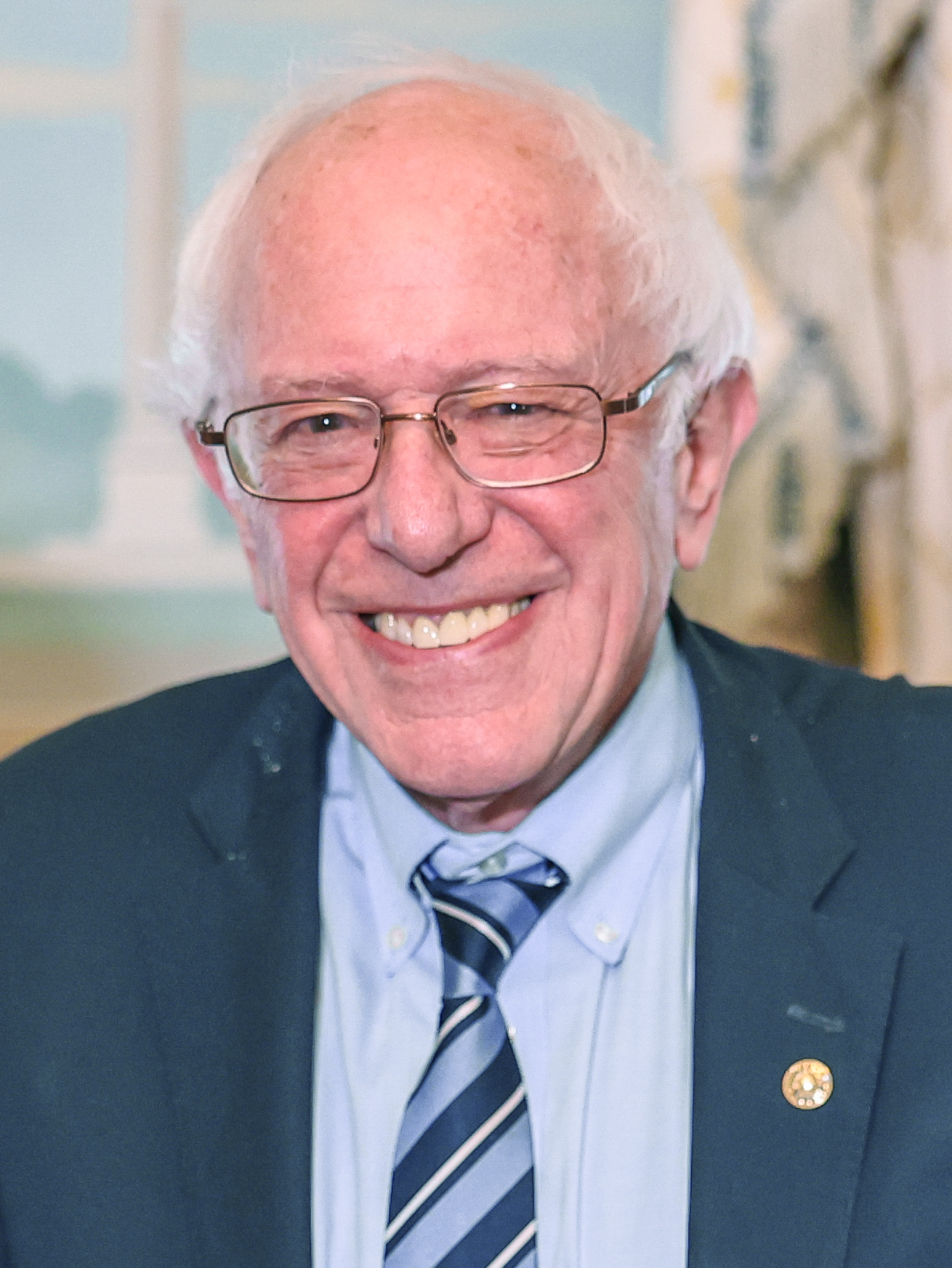
Bernie Sanders

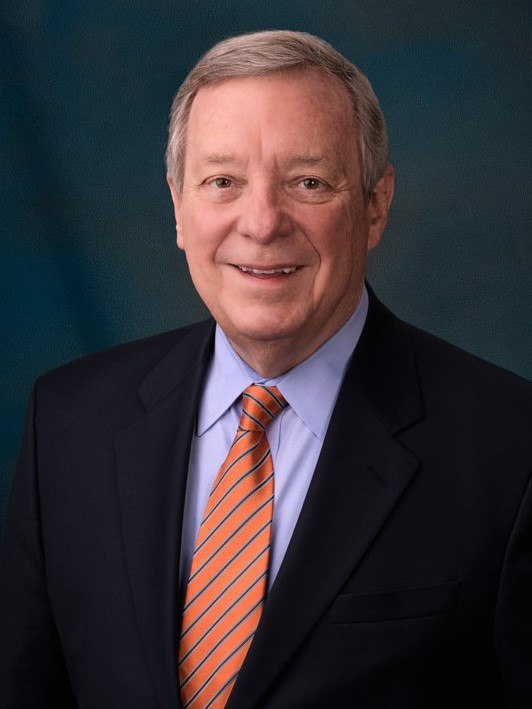
Dick Durbin

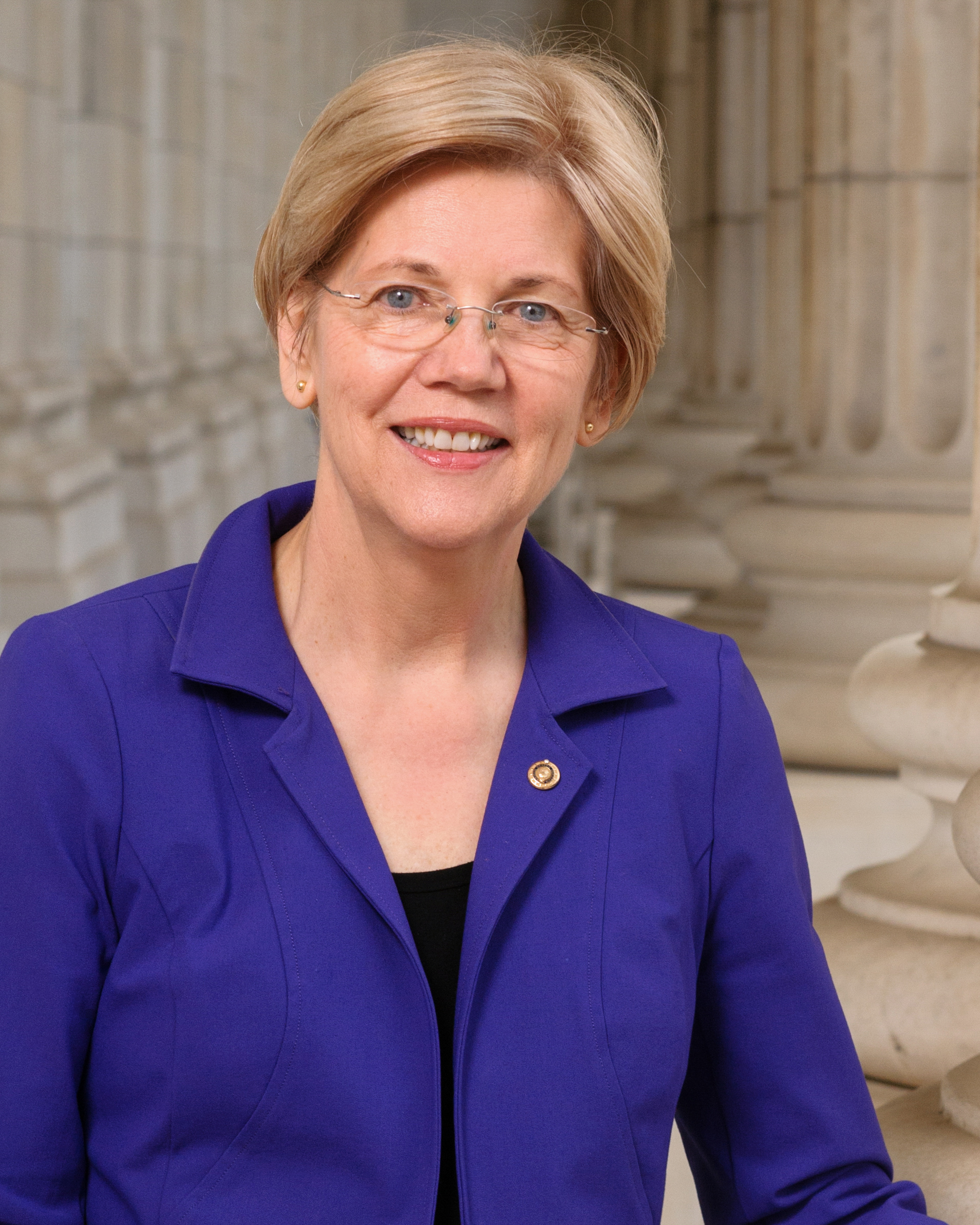
Elizabeth Warren

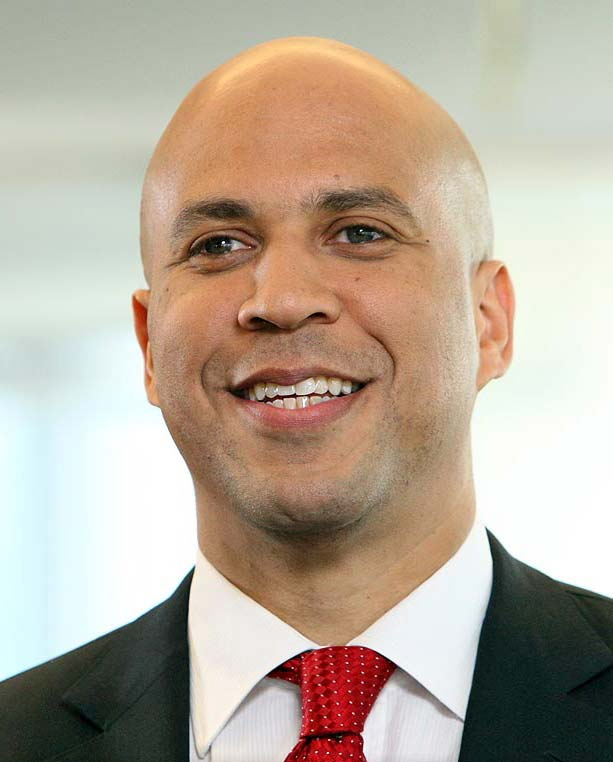
Cory Booker

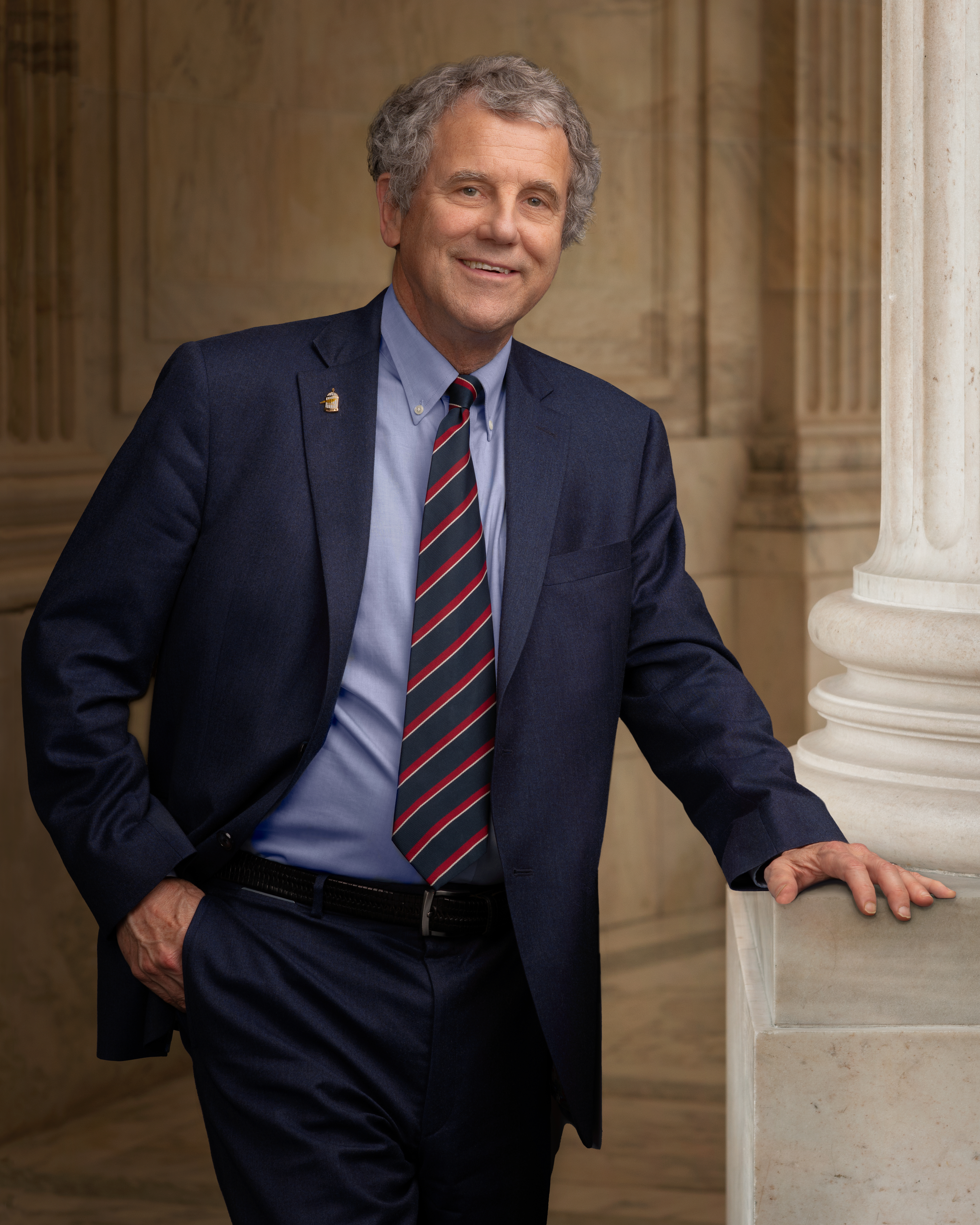
Sherrod Brown

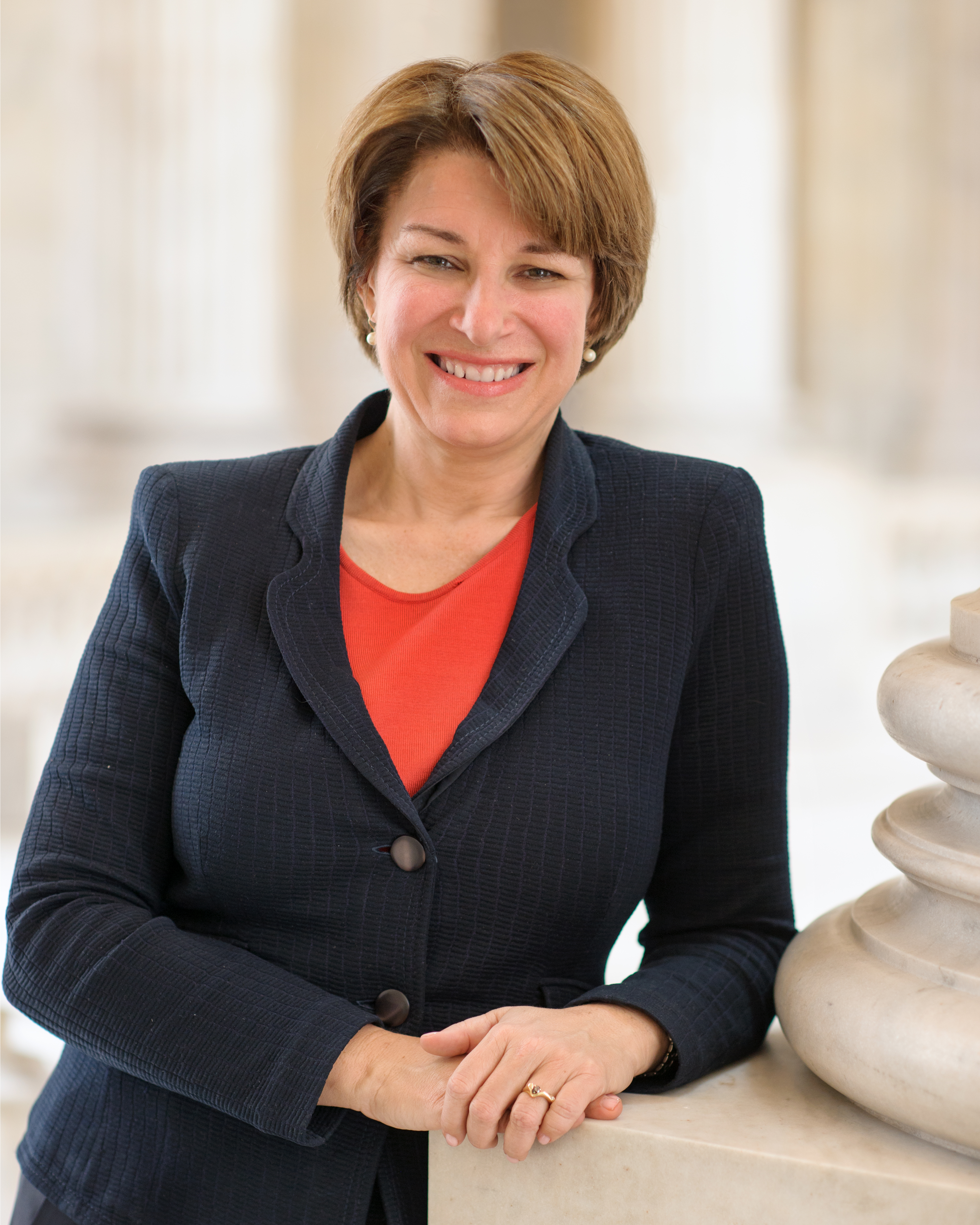
Amy Klobuchar

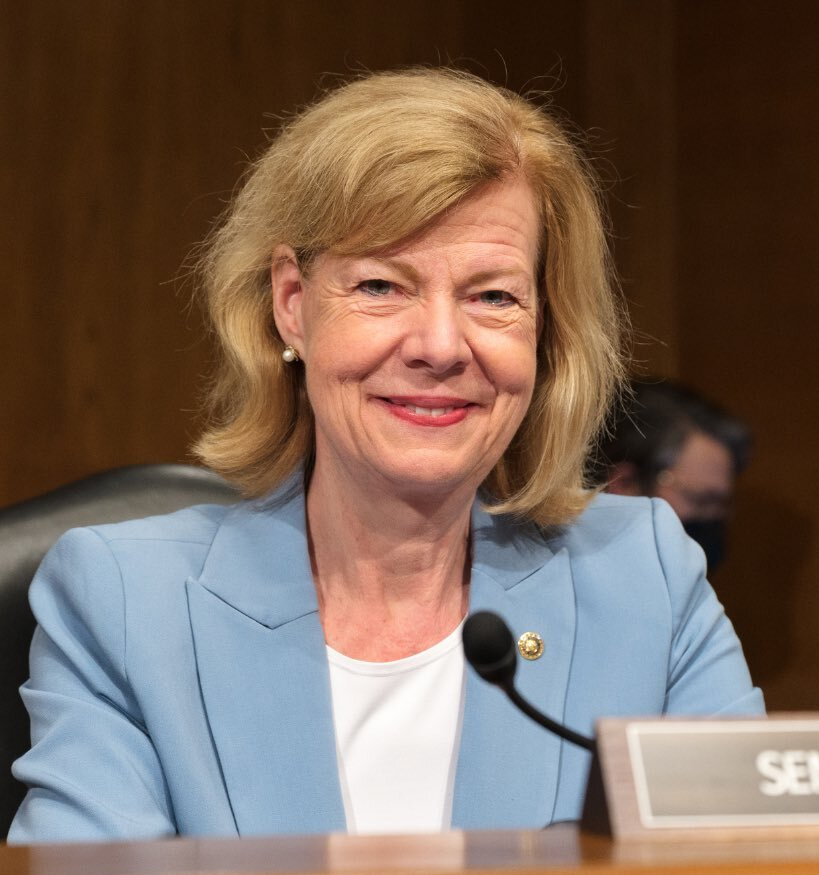
Tammy Baldwin

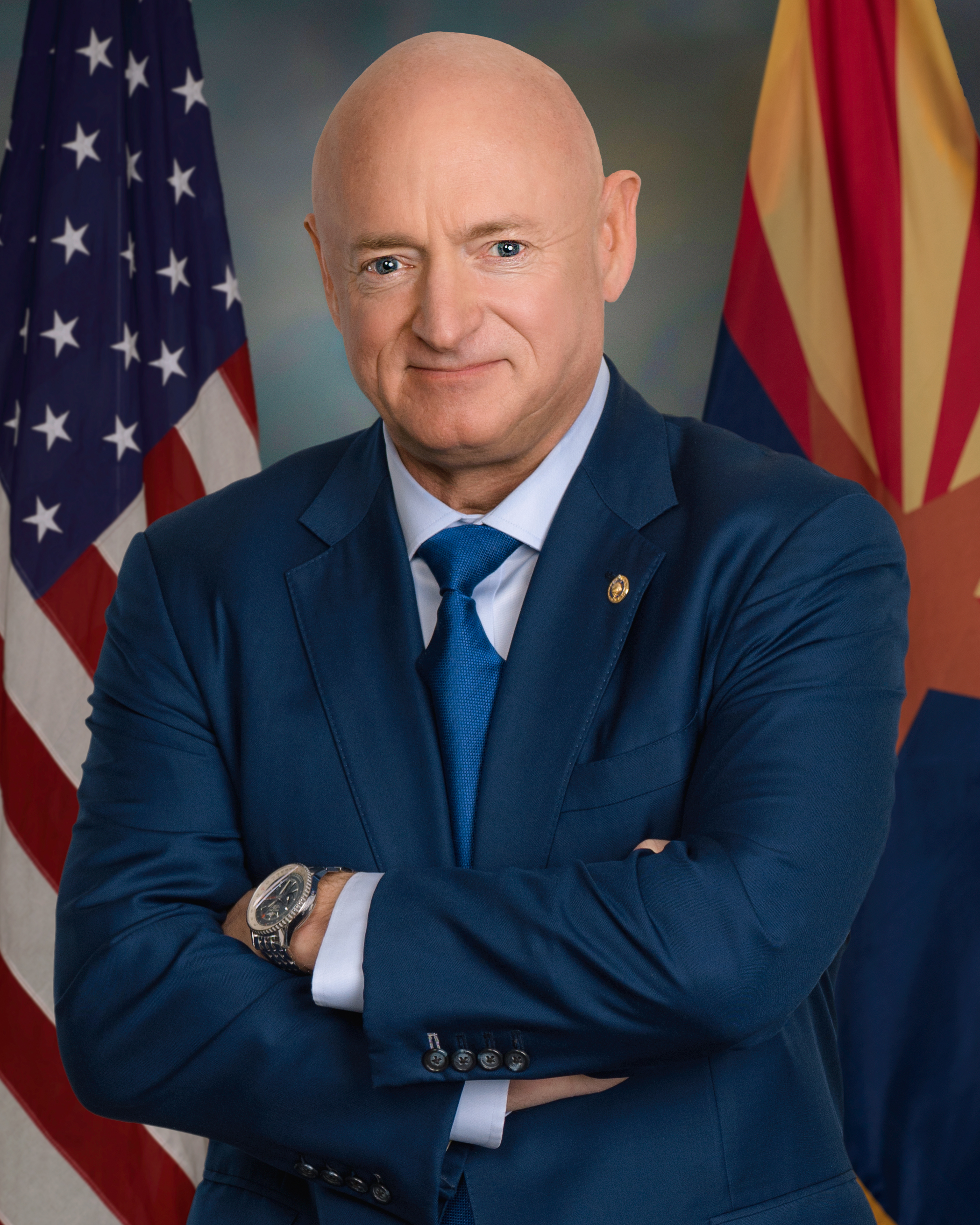
Mark Kelly

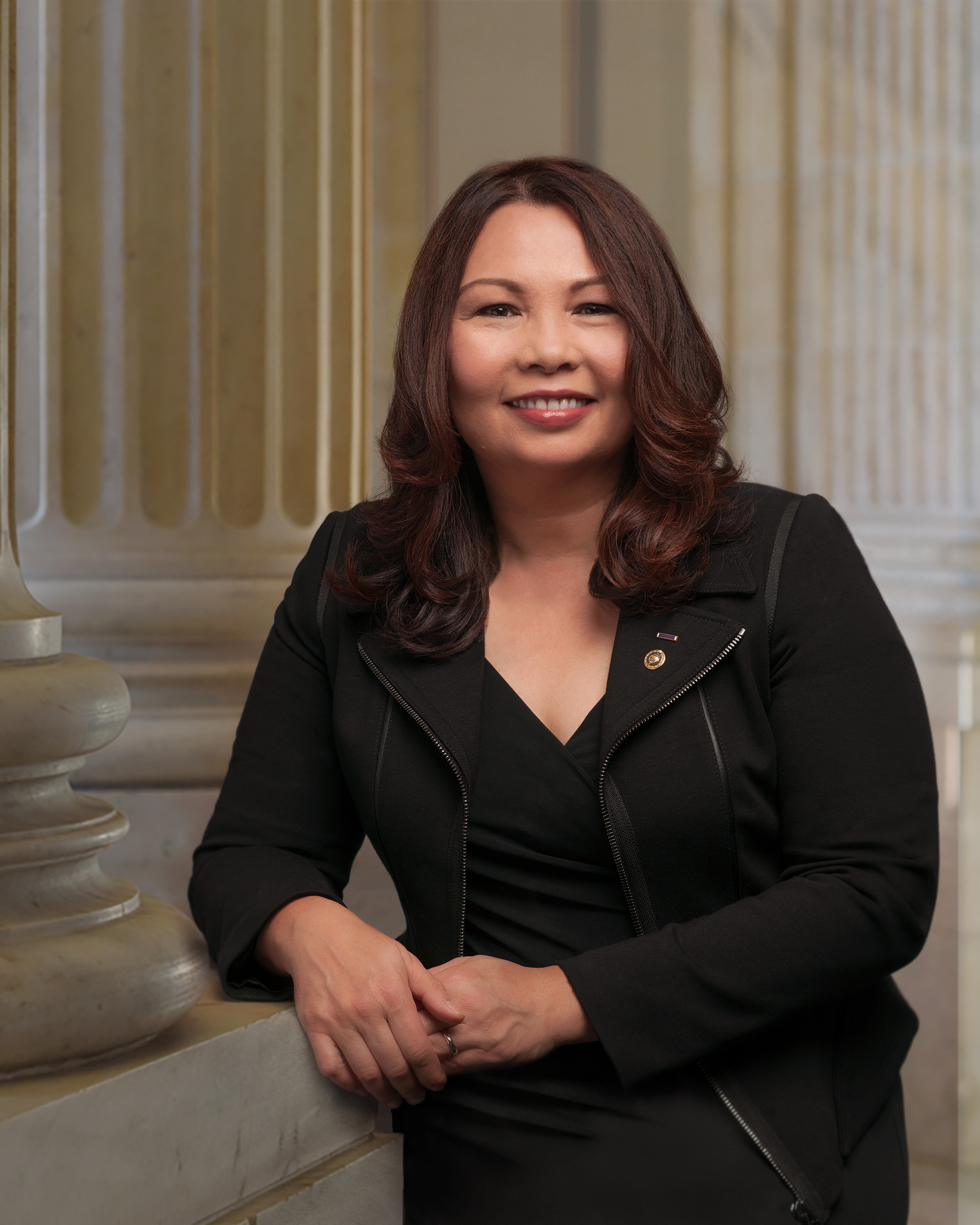
Tammy Duckworth

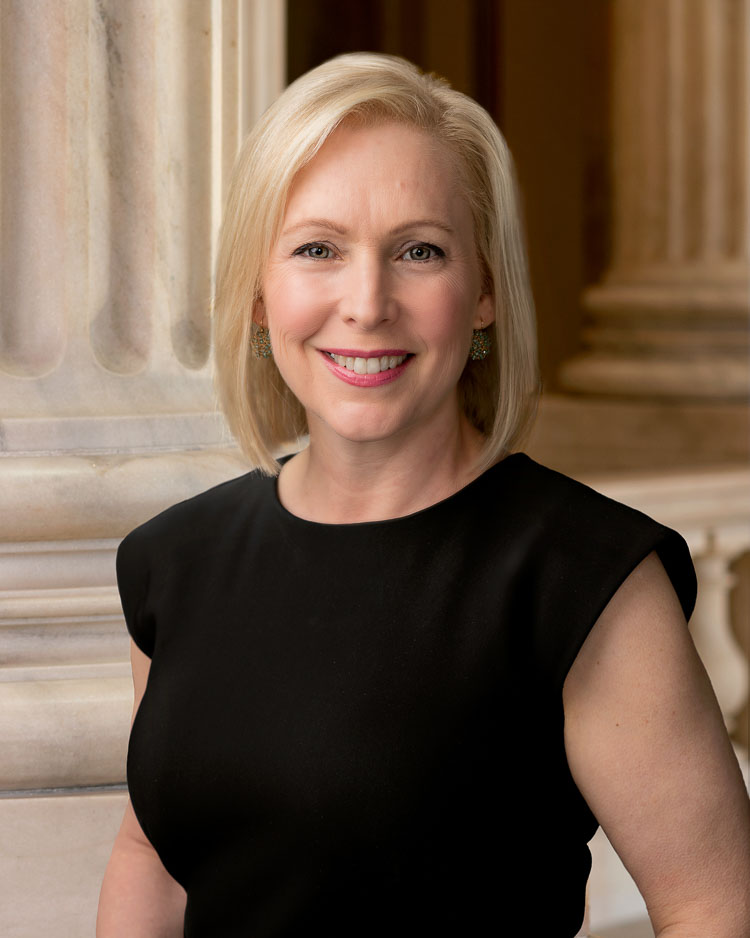
Kirsten Gillibrand

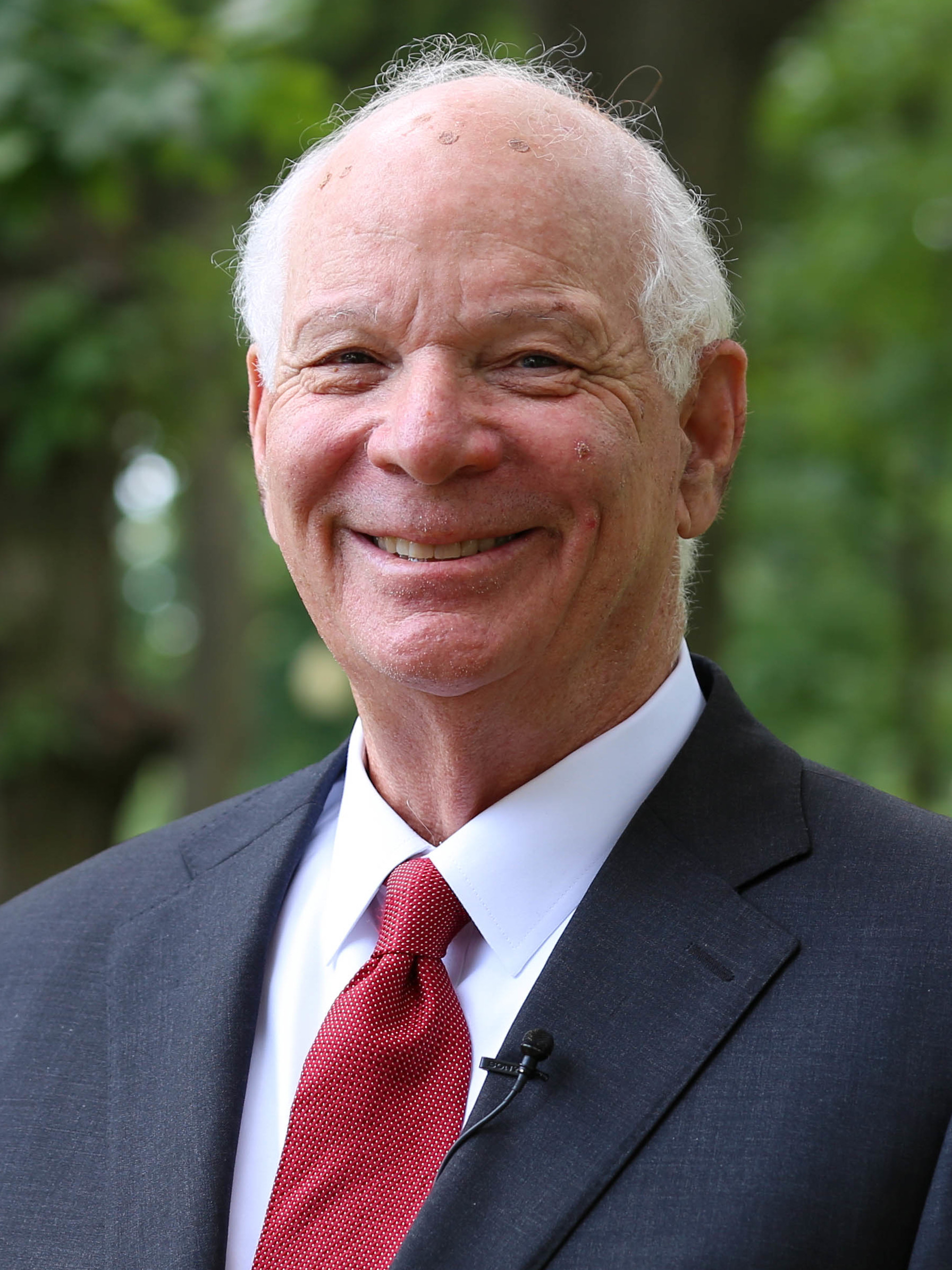
Ben Cardin

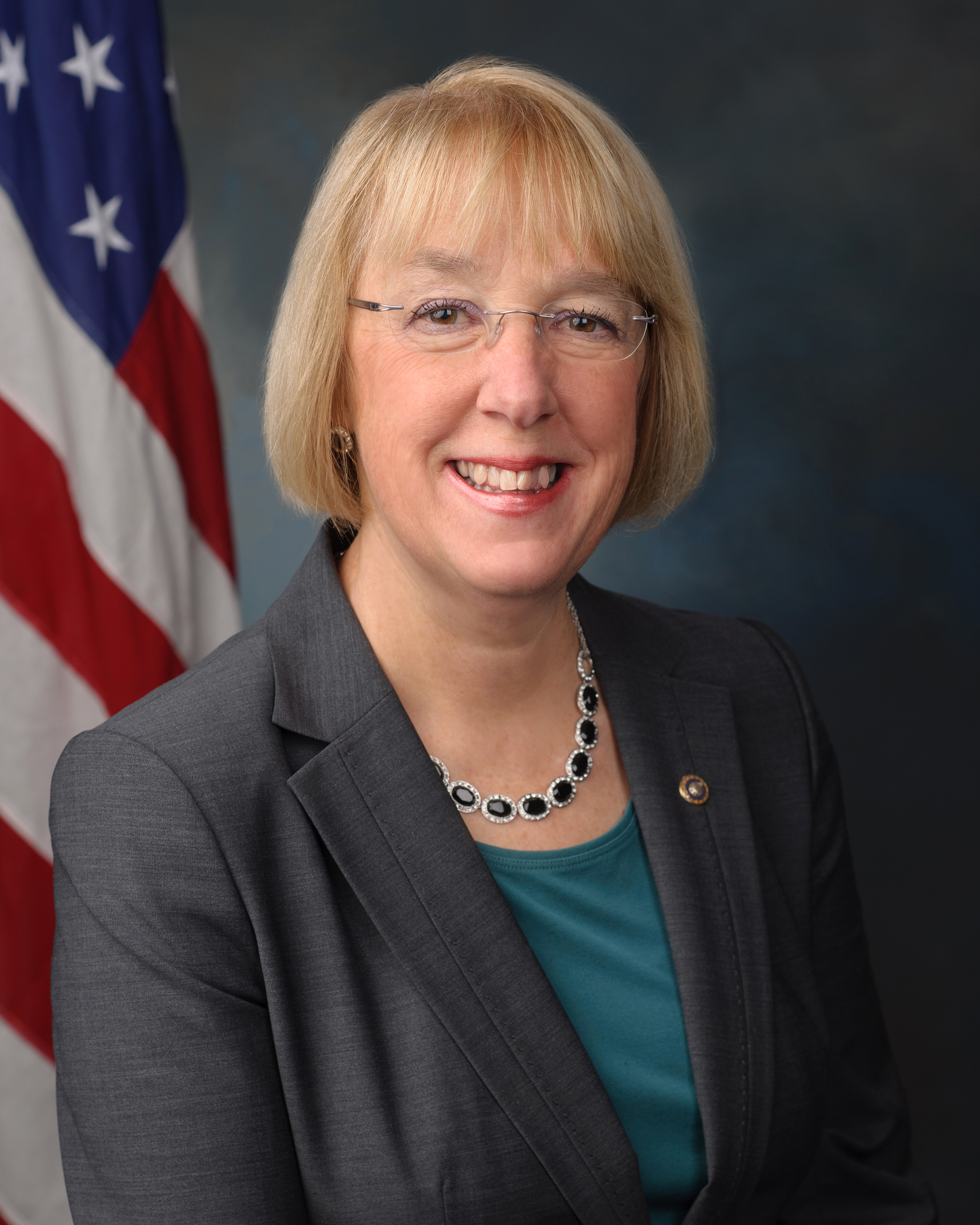
Patty Murray

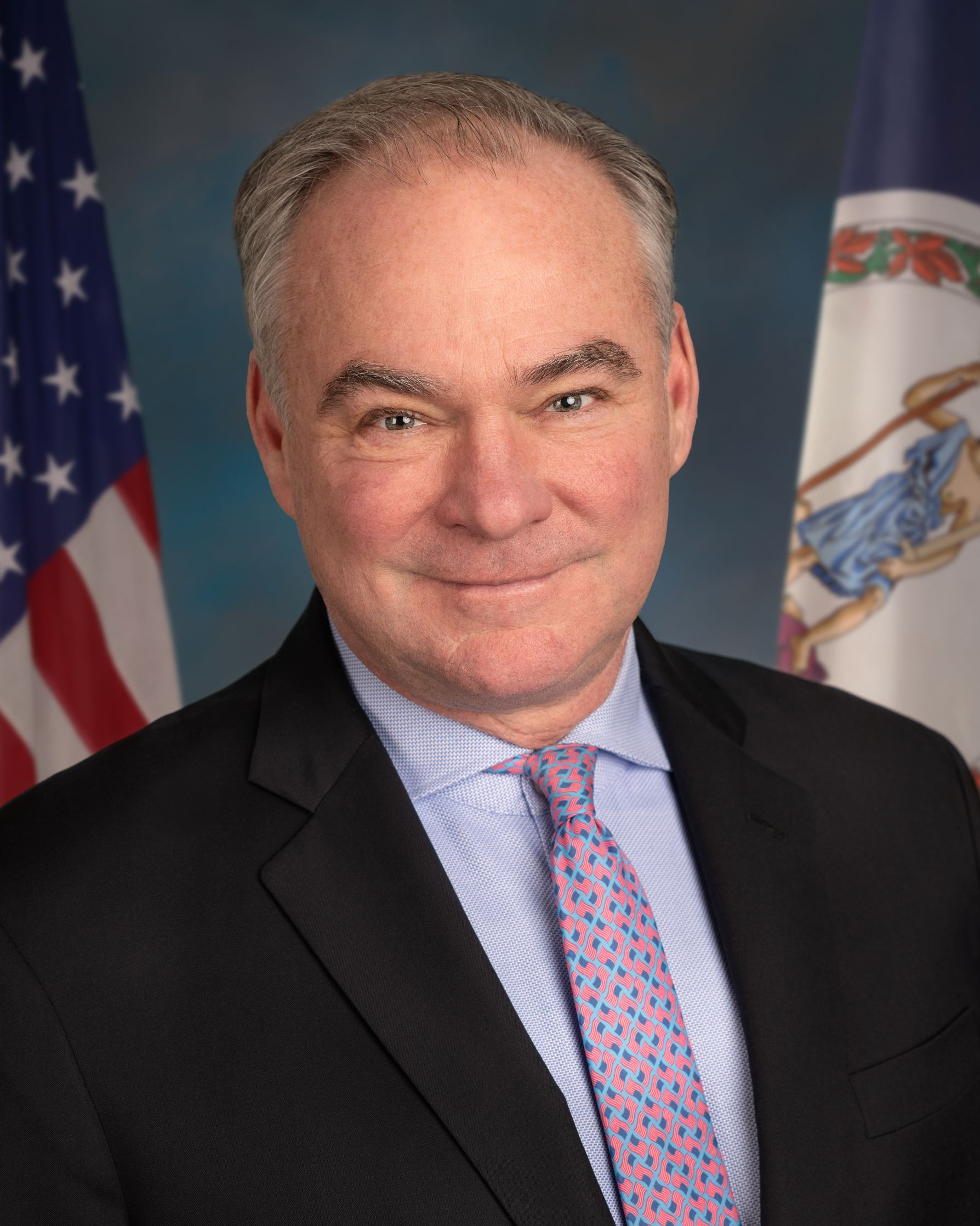
Tim Kaine

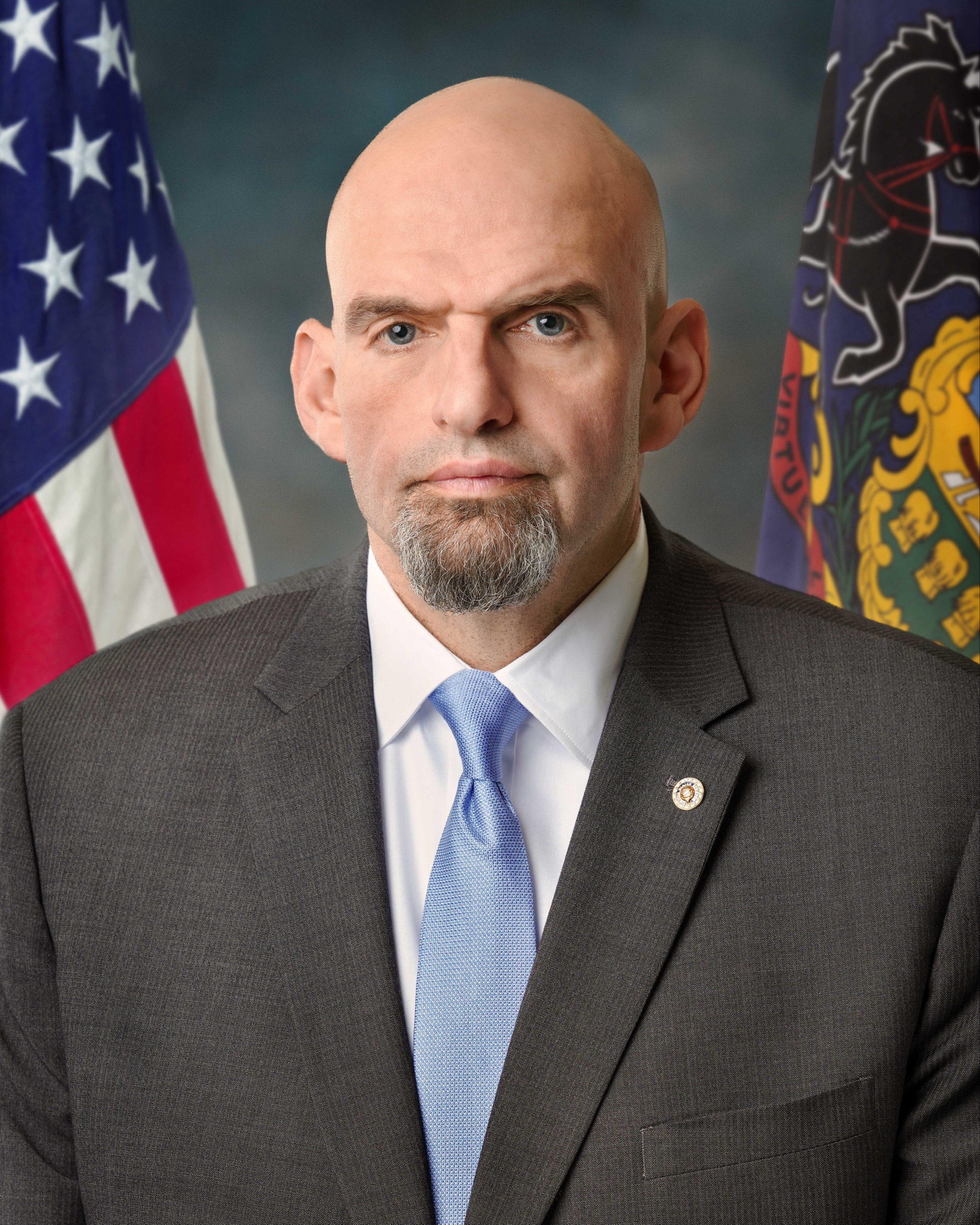
John Fetterman

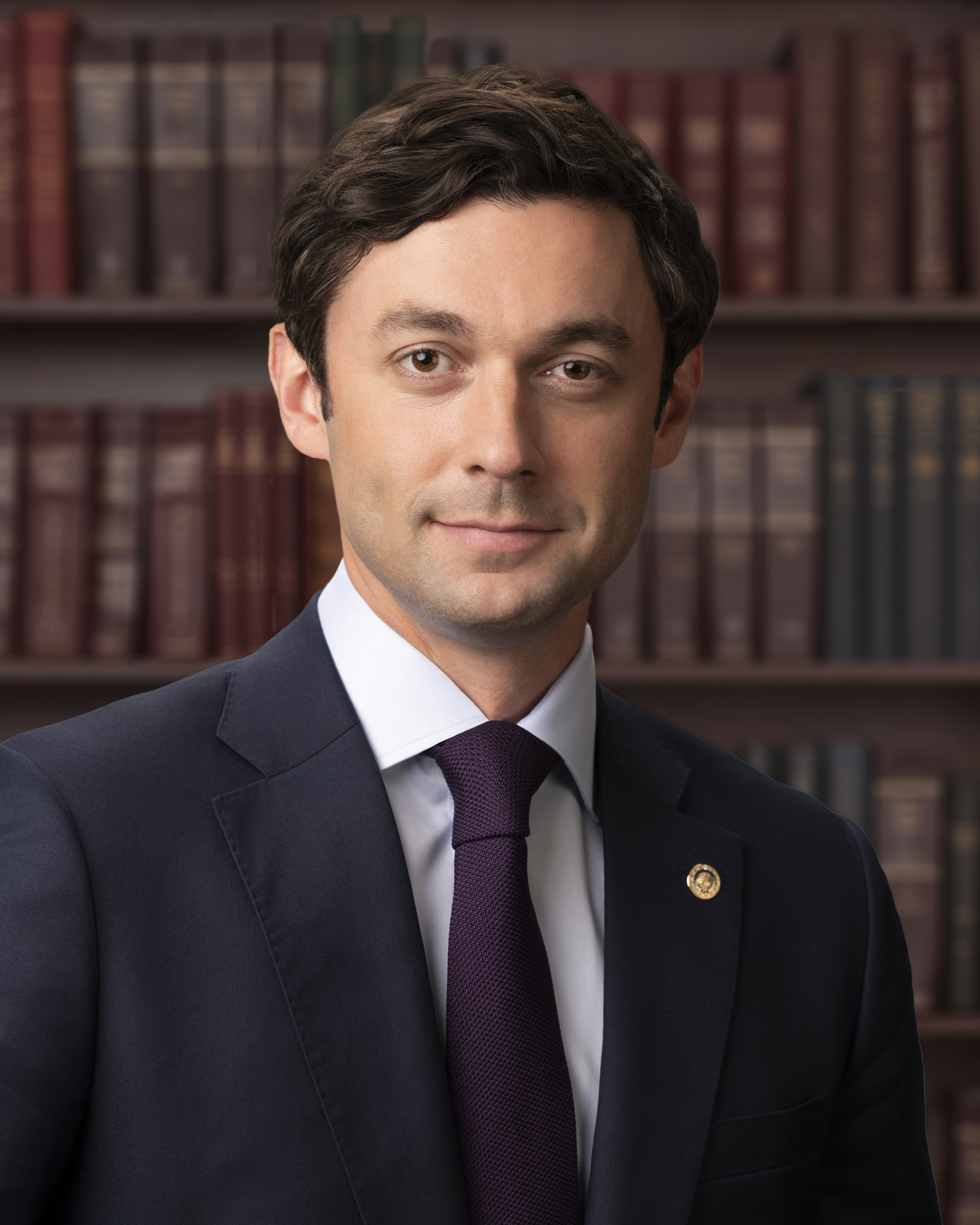
Jon Ossoff

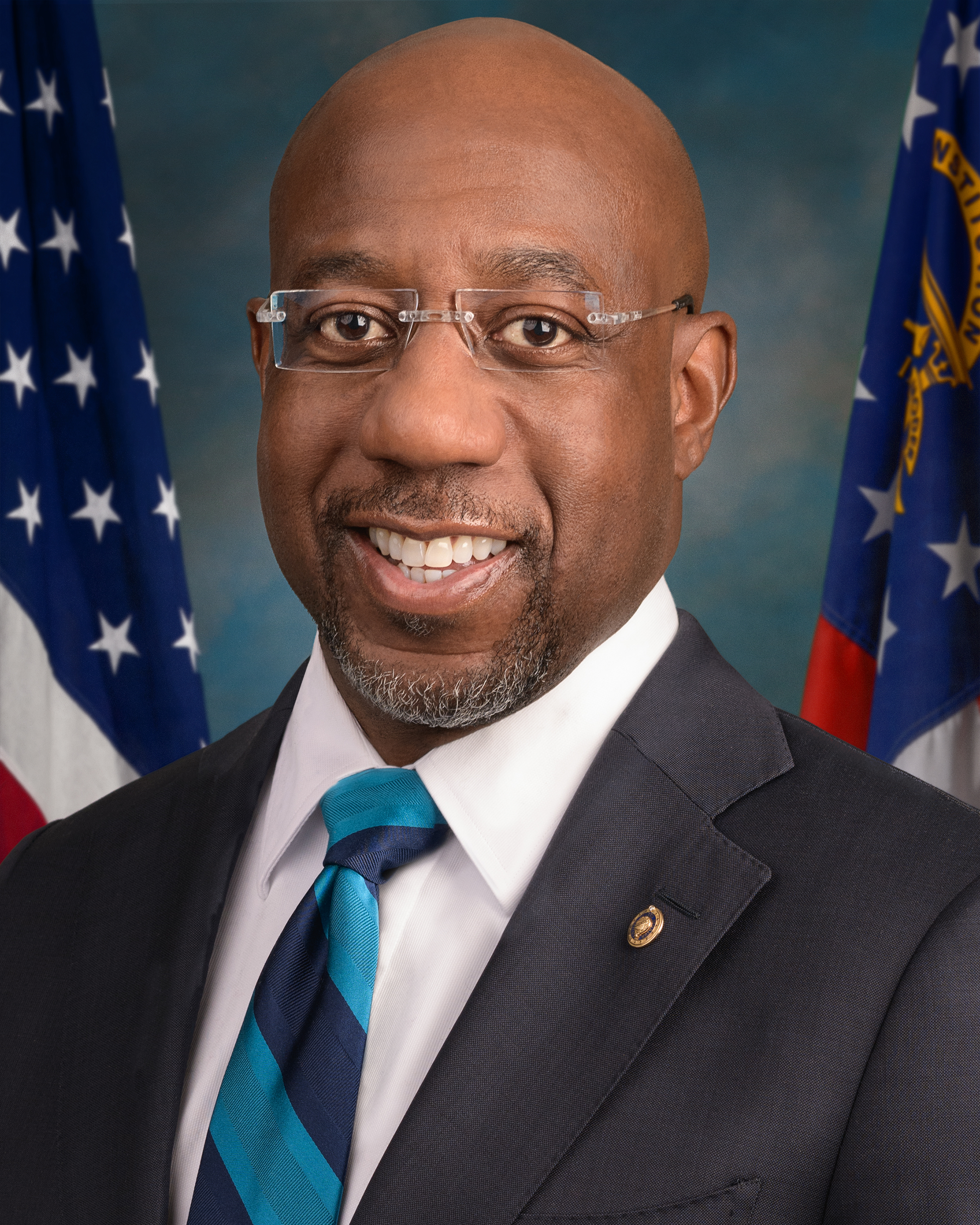
Raphael Warnock

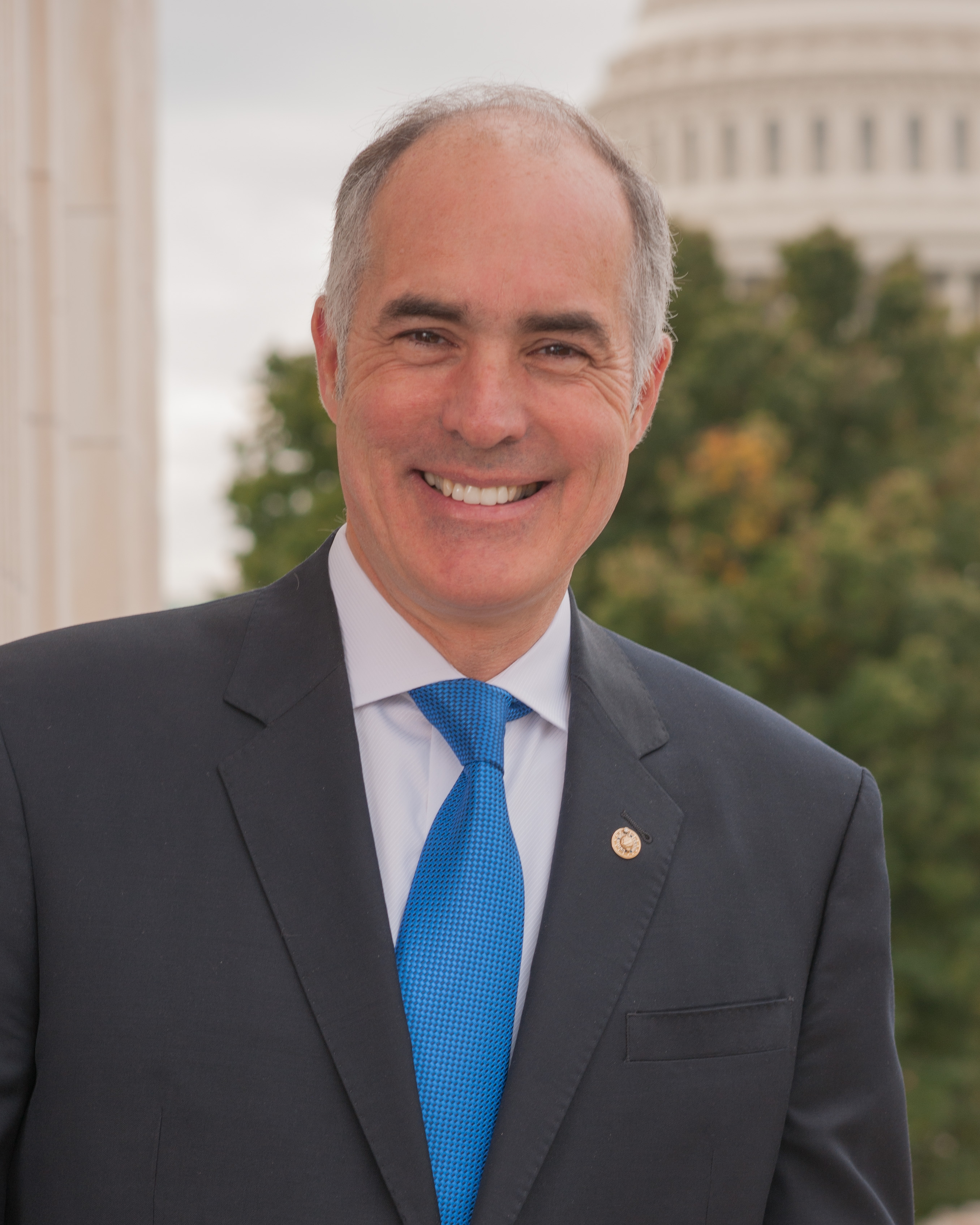
Bob Casey Jr.

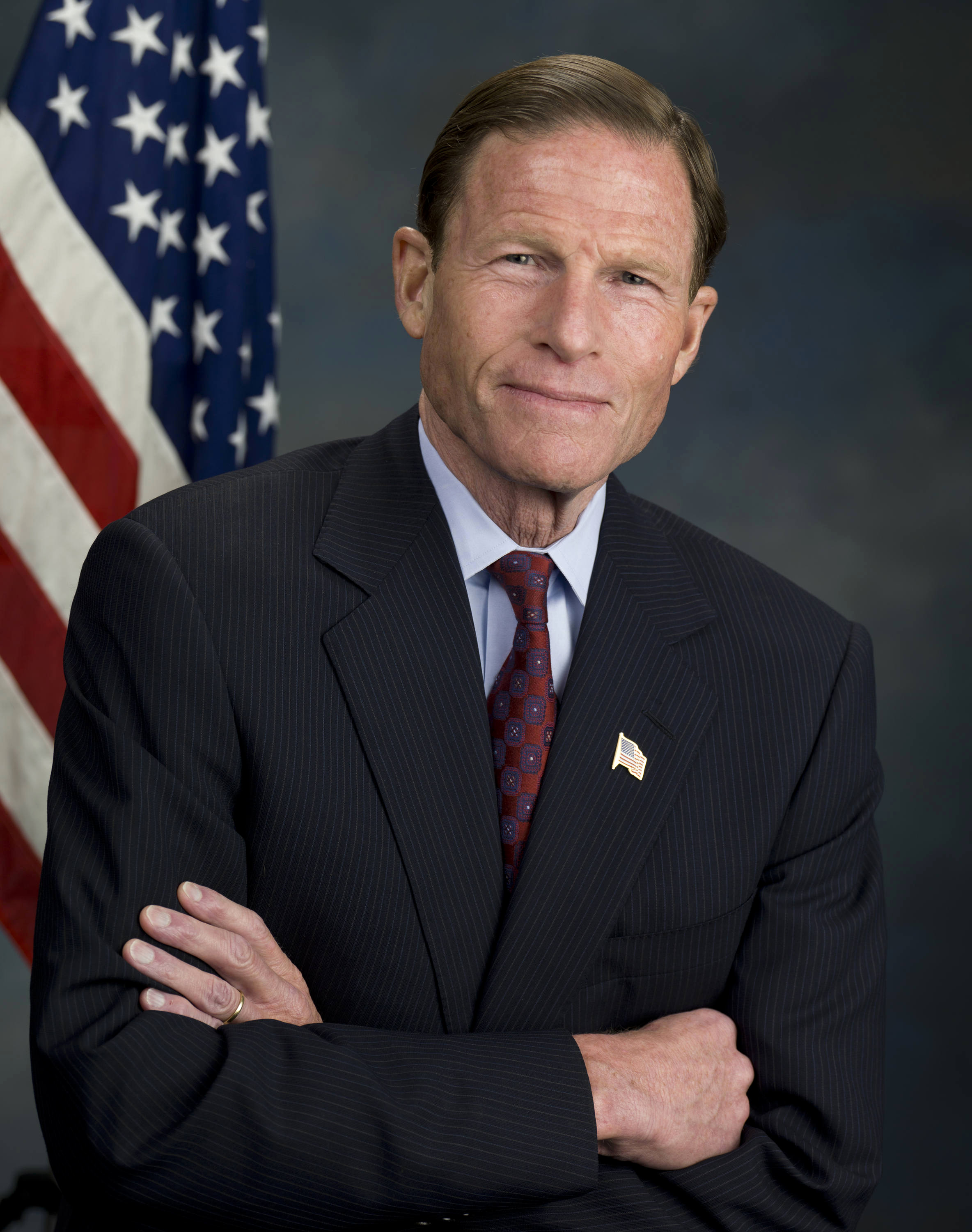
Richard Blumenthal

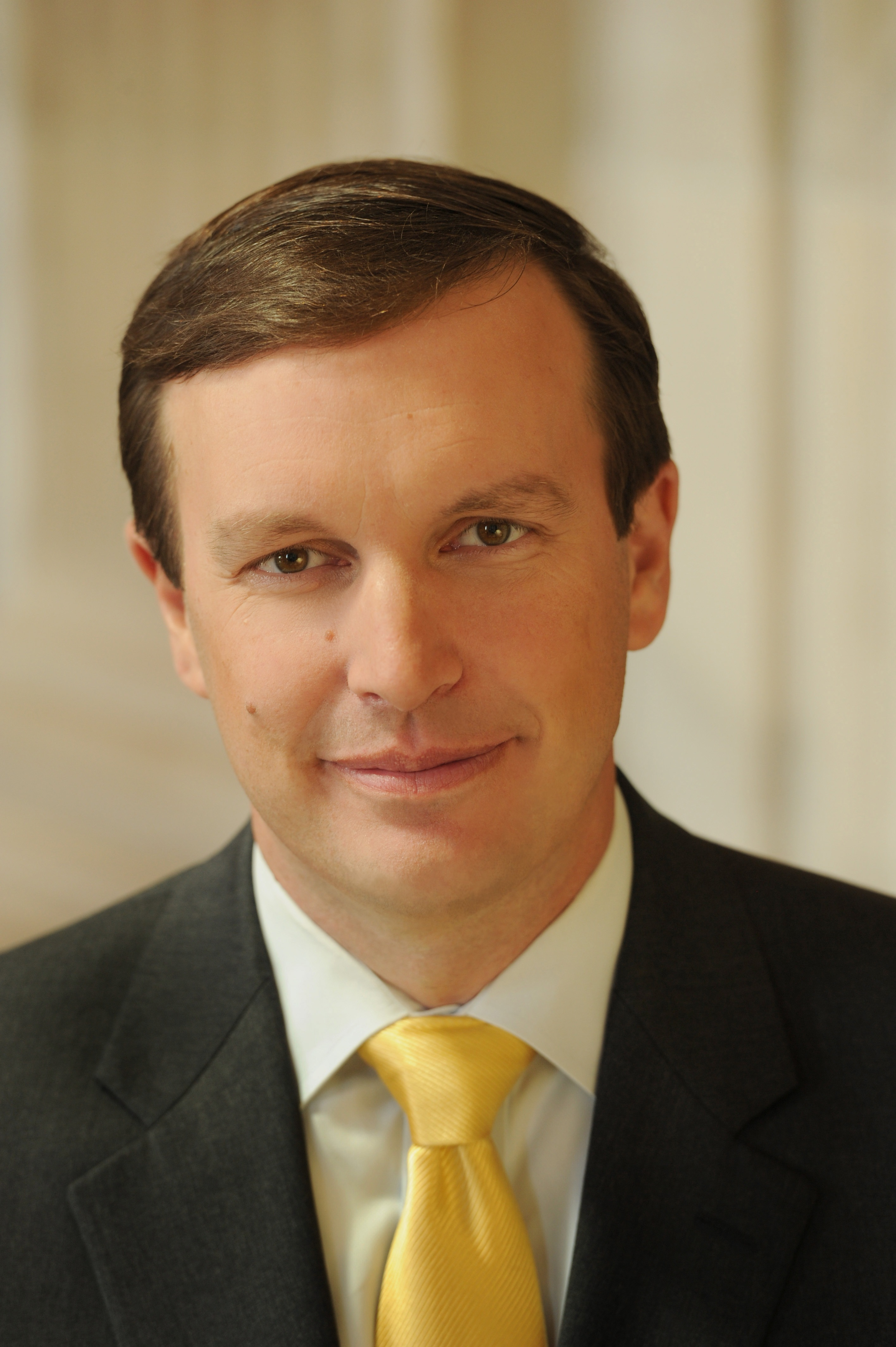
Chris Murphy

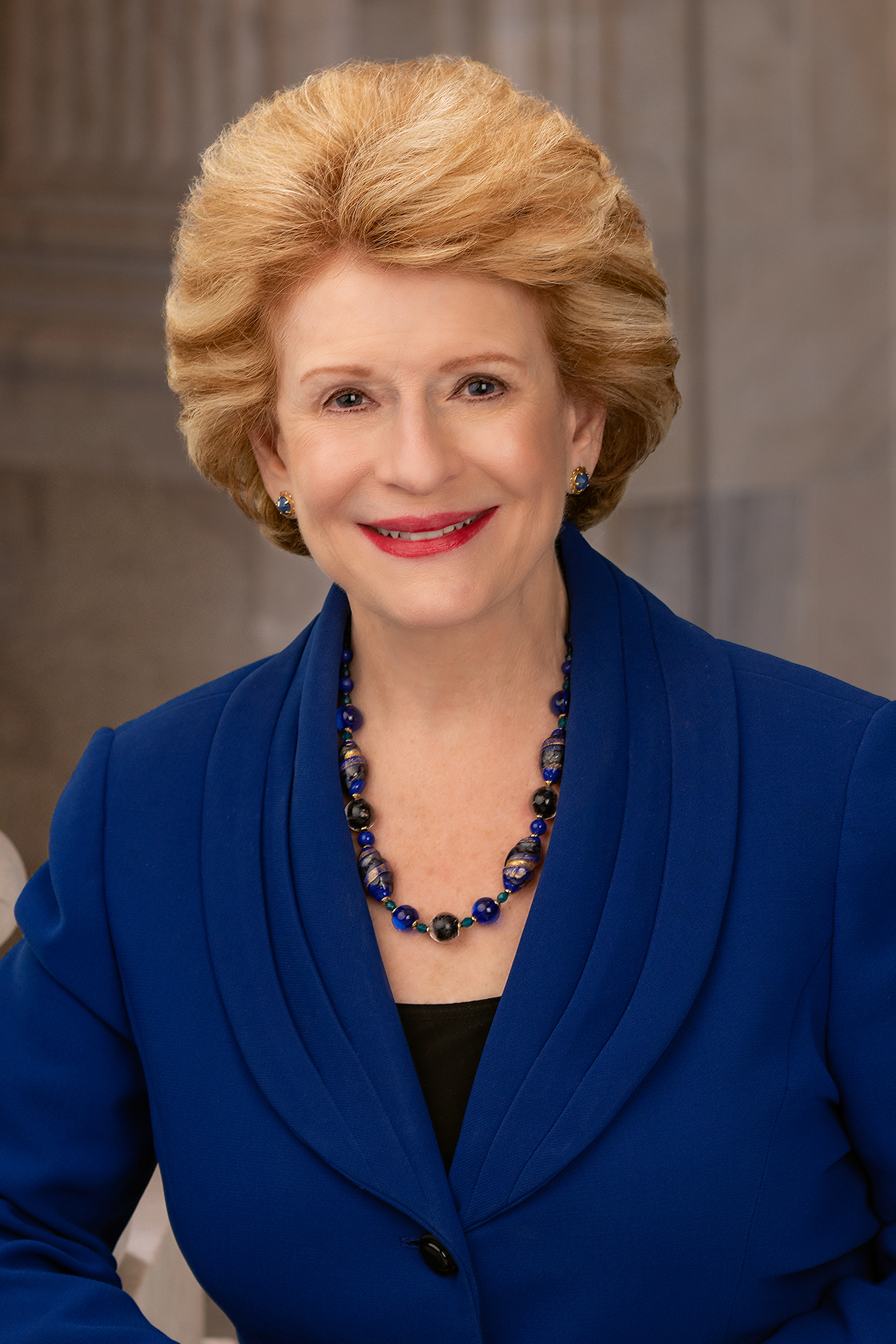
Debbie Stabenow

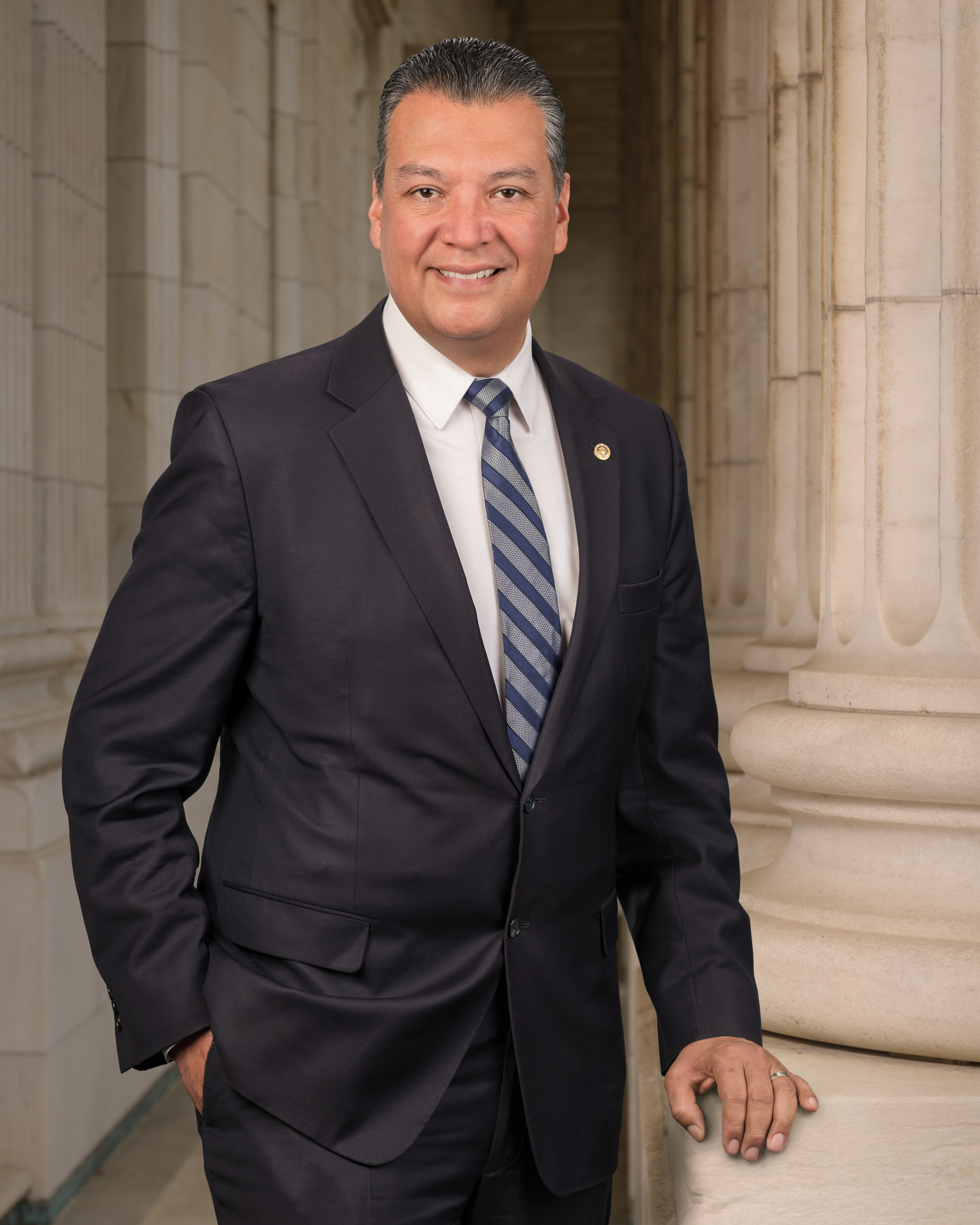
Alex Padilla

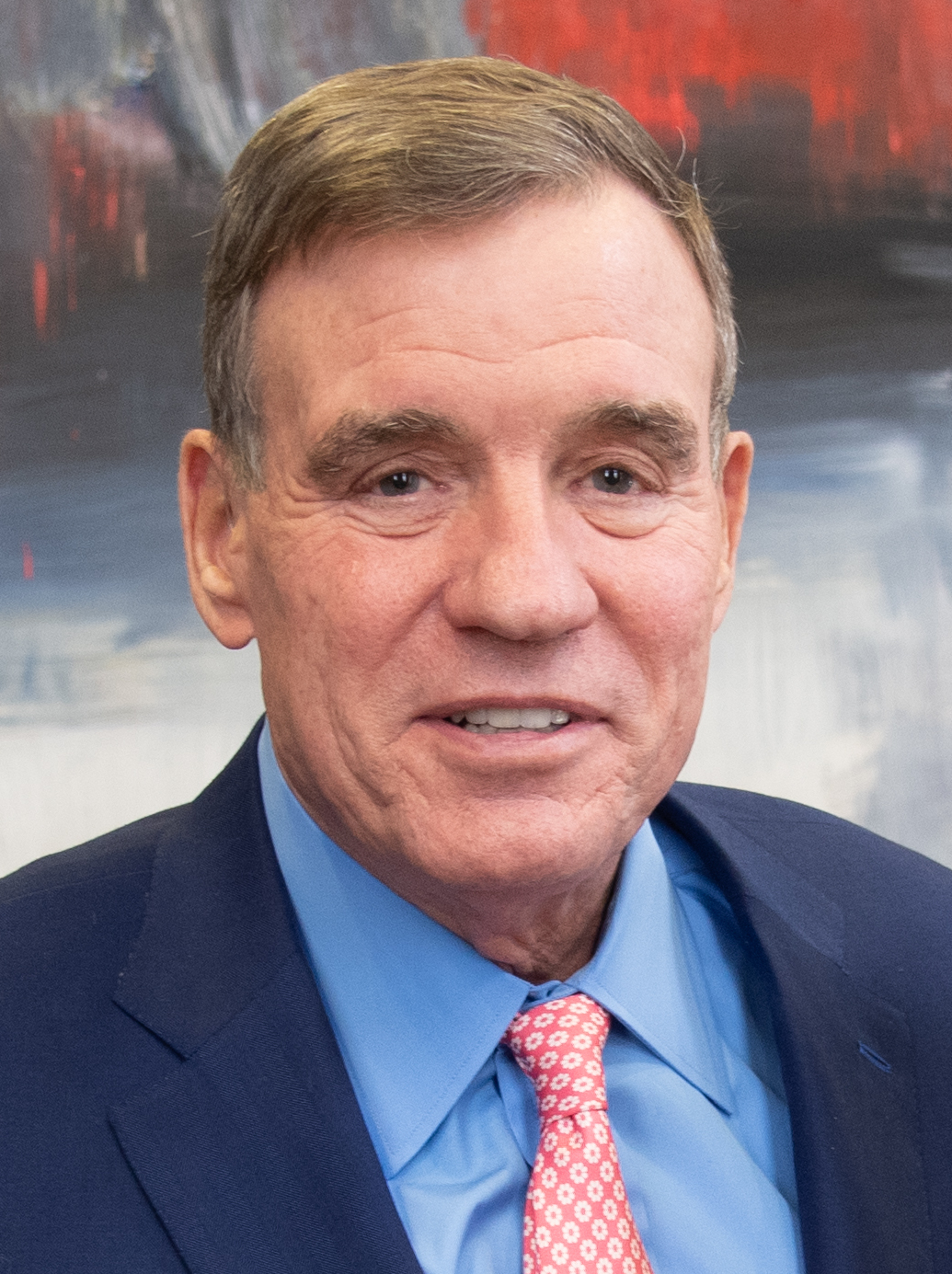
Mark Warner

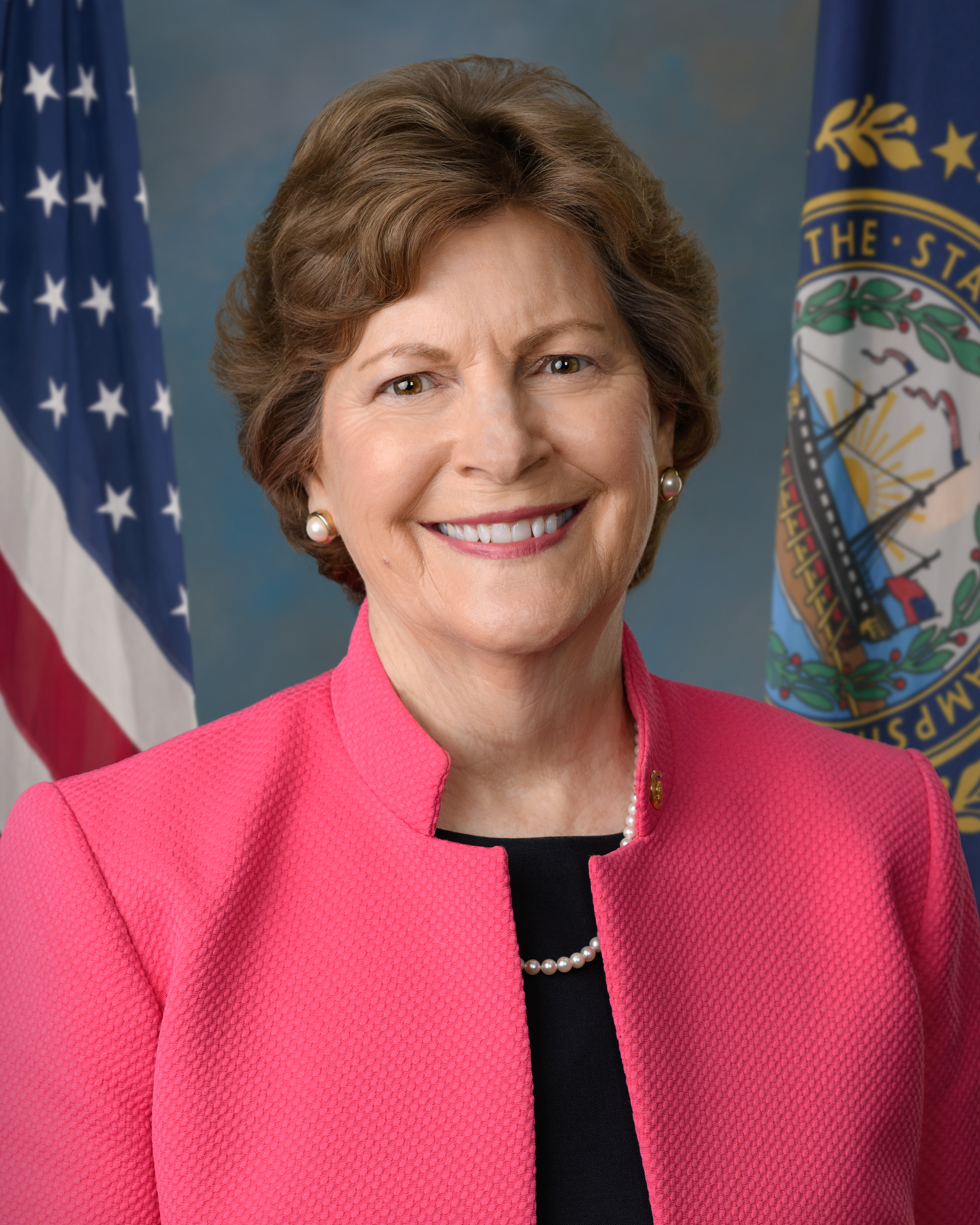
Jeanne Shaheen

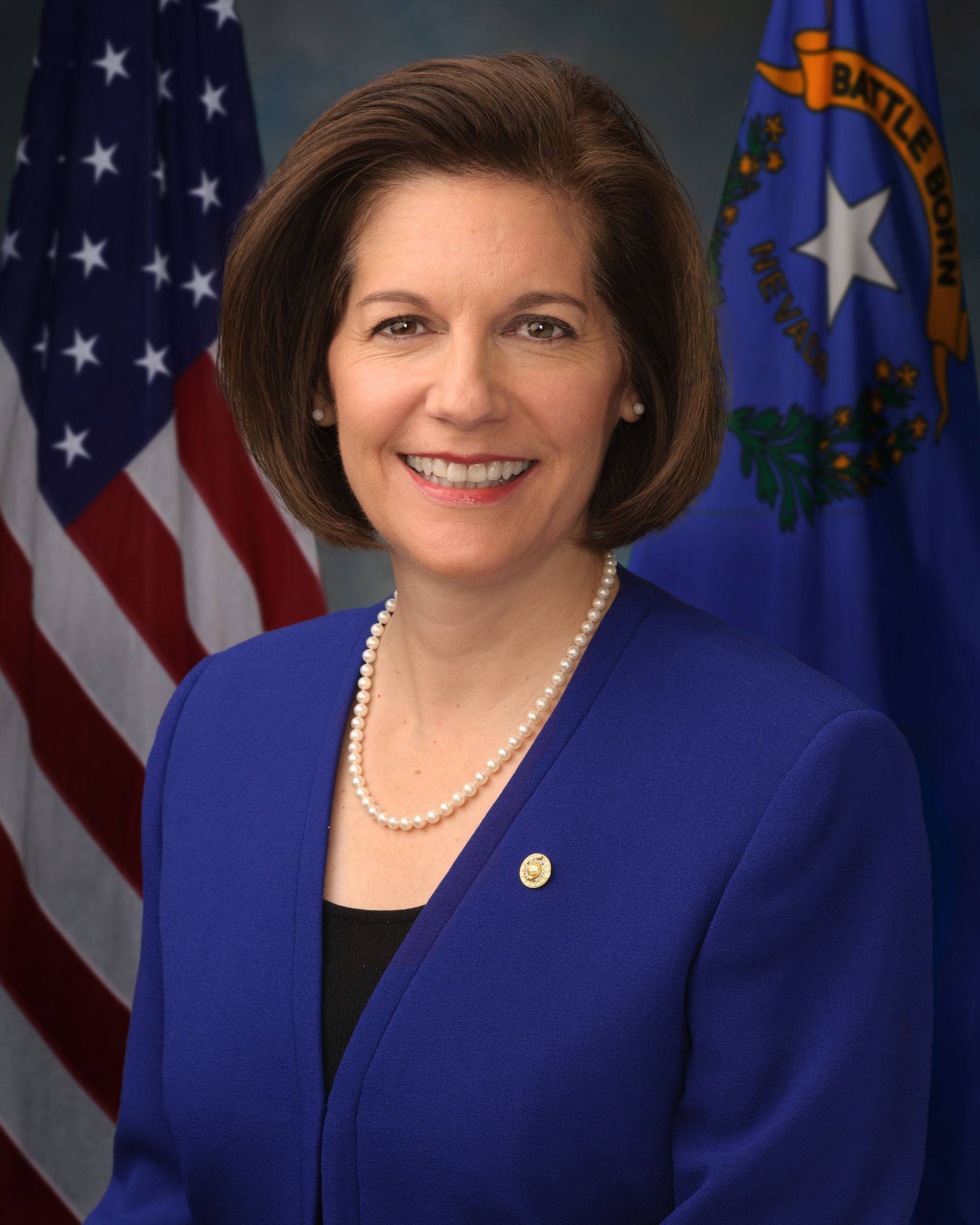
Catherine Cortez Masto

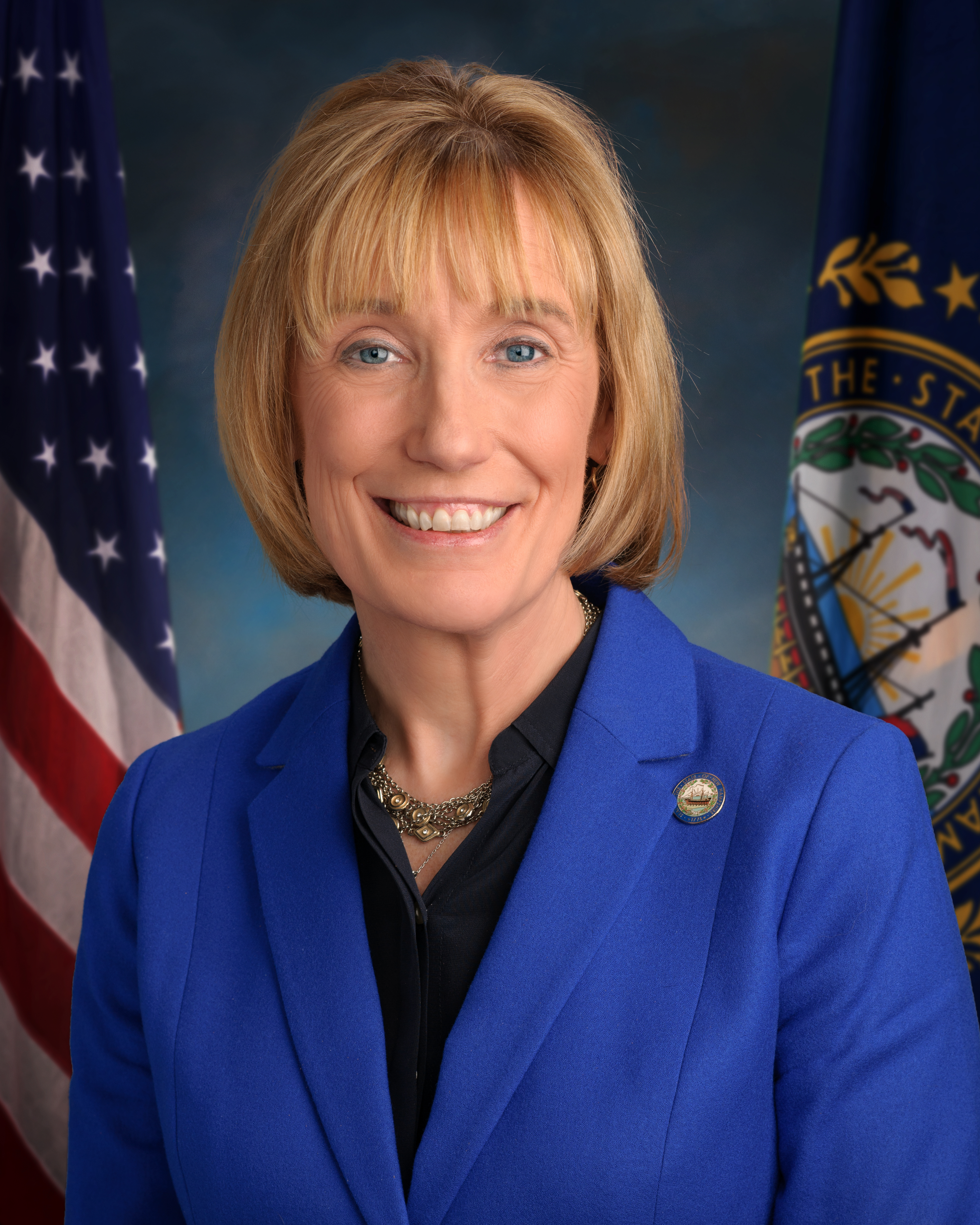
Maggie Hassan

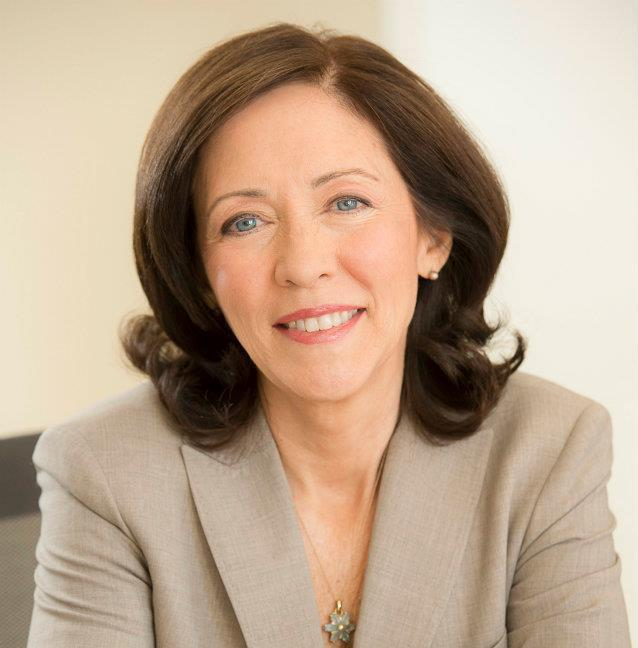
Maria Cantwell

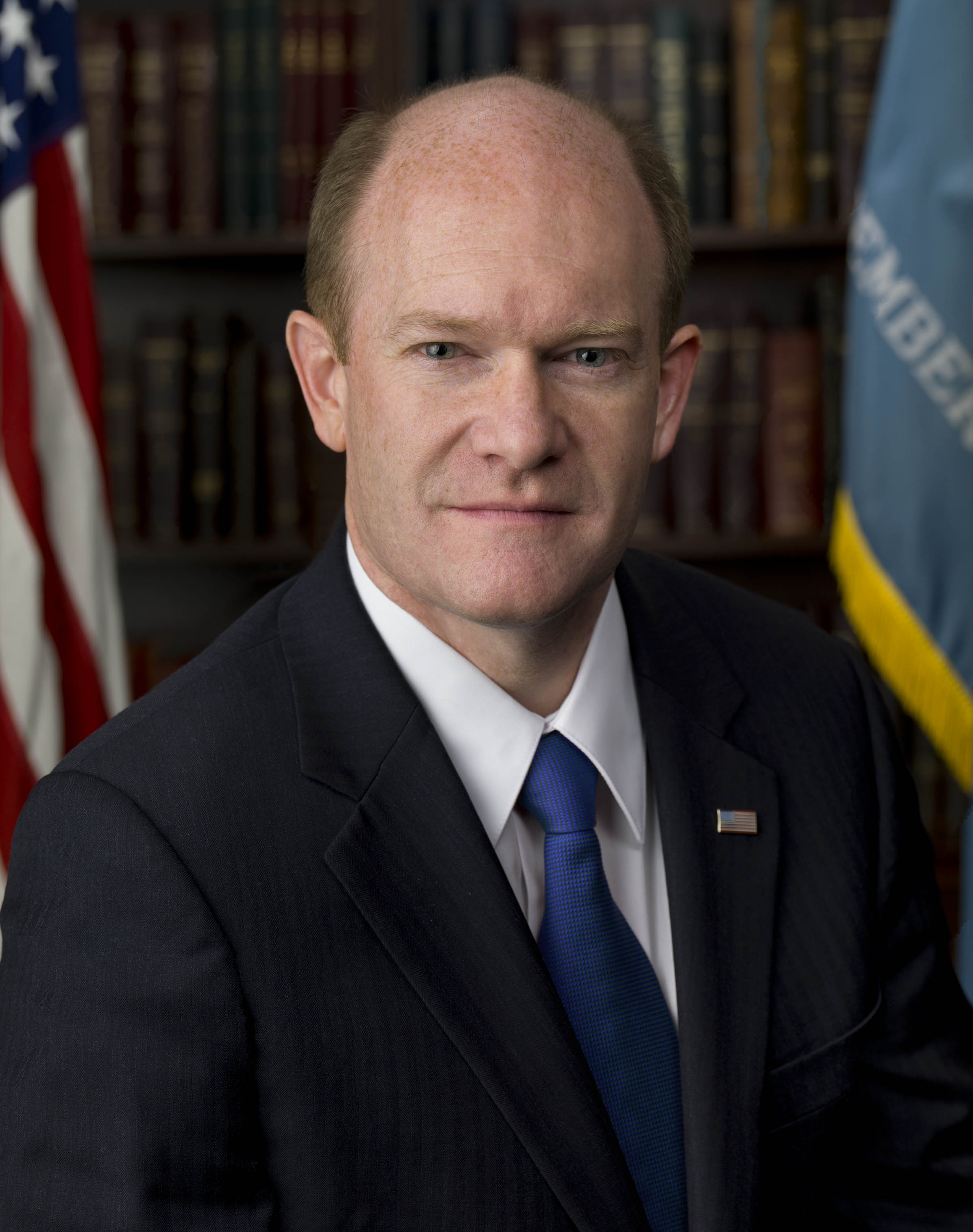
Chris Coons

- Tammy Baldwin, Wisconsin (2013–present)
- Michael Bennet, Colorado (2009–present), 2020 candidate for the Democratic nomination for president
- Richard Blumenthal, Connecticut (2011–present)
- Cory Booker, New Jersey (2013–present), 2020 candidate for the Democratic nomination for president
- Sherrod Brown, Ohio (2007–2025)
- Laphonza Butler, California (2023–2024)
- Maria Cantwell, Washington (2001–present)
- Ben Cardin, Maryland (2007–2025)
- Tom Carper, Delaware (2001–2025)
- Bob Casey Jr., Pennsylvania (2007–2025)
- Chris Coons, Delaware (2010–present)
- Catherine Cortez Masto, Nevada (2017–present)
- Tammy Duckworth, Illinois (2017–present)
- Dick Durbin, Illinois (1997–present), Senate Majority Whip (2007–2015, 2021–present), Senate Minority Whip (2005–2007, 2015–2021)
- John Fetterman, Pennsylvania (2023–present)
- Kirsten Gillibrand, New York (2009–present), 2020 candidate for the Democratic nomination for president
- Maggie Hassan, New Hampshire (2017–present)
- Martin Heinrich, New Mexico (2013–present)
- George Helmy, New Jersey (2024)
- John Hickenlooper, Colorado (2021–present), 2020 candidate for the Democratic nomination for president
- Mazie Hirono, Hawaii (2013–present)
- Tim Kaine, Virginia (2013–present), 2016 Democratic nominee for vice president
- Mark Kelly, Arizona (2020–present)
- Angus King, Maine (2013–present) (Independent)
- Amy Klobuchar, Minnesota (2007–present), 2020 candidate for the Democratic nomination for president
- Ben Ray Luján, New Mexico (2021–present)
- Ed Markey, Massachusetts (2013–present)
- Jeff Merkley, Oregon (2009–present)
- Chris Murphy, Connecticut (2013–present)
- Patty Murray, Washington (1993–present), President pro tempore of the Senate (2023–2025)
- Jon Ossoff, Georgia (2021–present)
- Alex Padilla, California (2021–present)
- Gary Peters, Michigan (2015–present)
- Jack Reed, Rhode Island (1997–present)
- Jacky Rosen, Nevada (2019–present)
- Bernie Sanders, Vermont (2007–present), 2016 and 2020 candidate for the Democratic nomination for president (Independent)
- Brian Schatz, Hawaii (2012–present)
- Chuck Schumer, New York (1999–present), Senate Majority Leader (2021–2025), Senate Minority Leader (2017–2021, 2025–present)
- Jeanne Shaheen, New Hampshire (2009–present)
- Tina Smith, Minnesota (2018–present)
- Debbie Stabenow, Michigan (2001–2025)
- Chris Van Hollen, Maryland (2017–present)
- Mark Warner, Virginia (2009–present)
- Raphael Warnock, Georgia (2021–present)
- Elizabeth Warren, Massachusetts (2013–present), 2020 candidate for the Democratic nomination for president
- Peter Welch, Vermont (2023–present)
- Sheldon Whitehouse, Rhode Island (2007–present)
- Ron Wyden, Oregon (1996–present)

=== Shadow senators ===
- Paul Strauss, shadow senator from the District of Columbia (1997–present)

=== Former ===
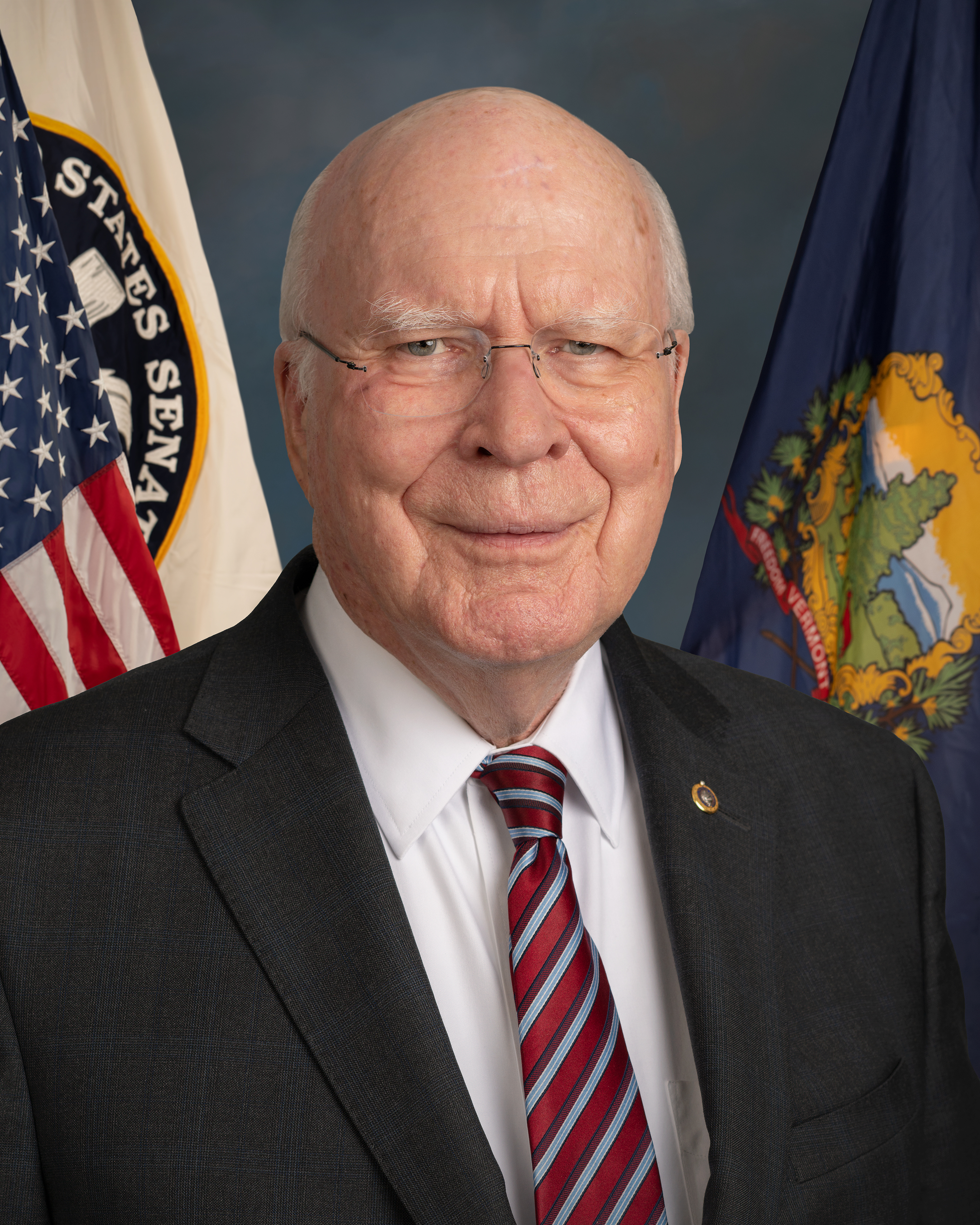
Patrick Leahy

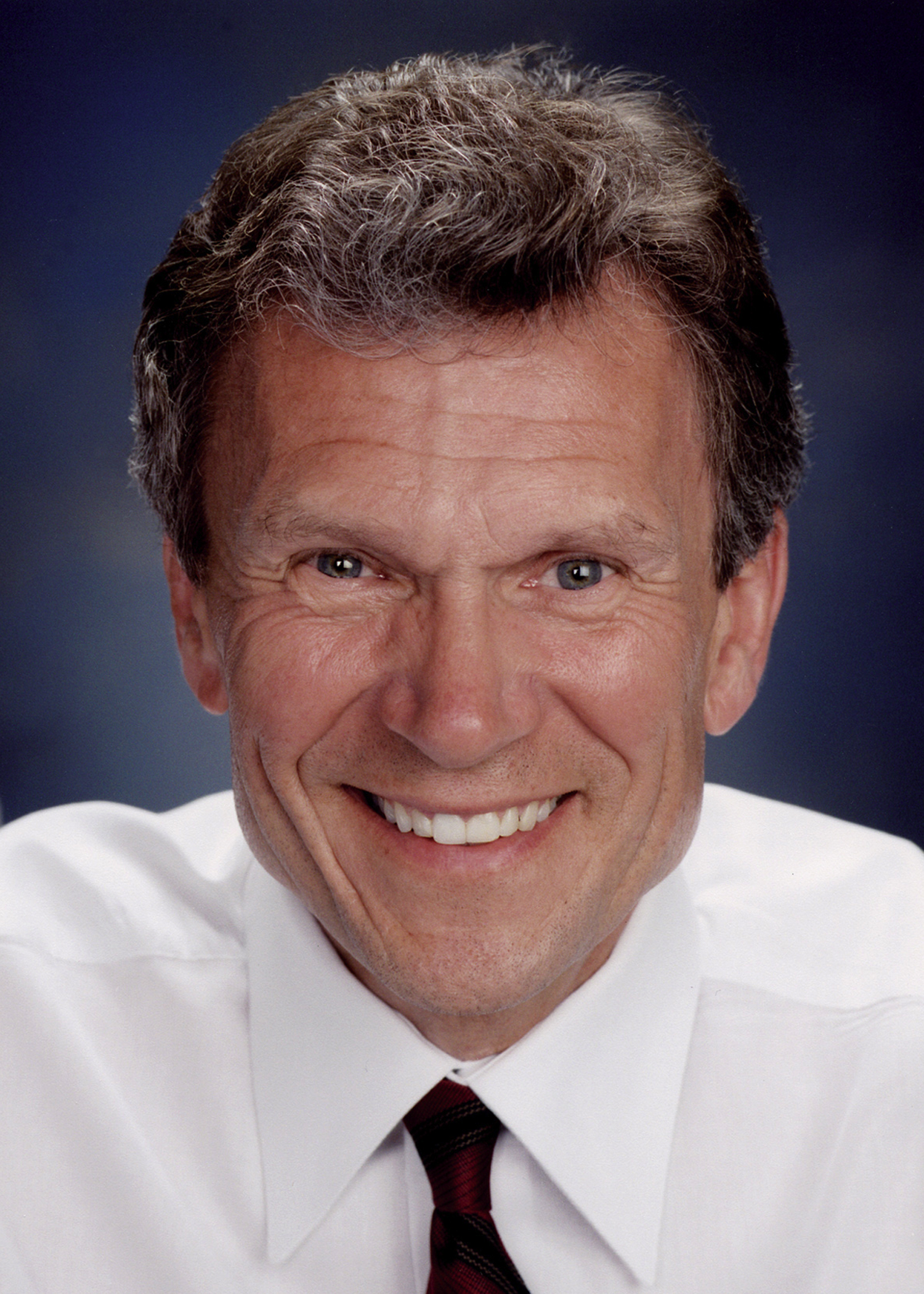
Tom Daschle

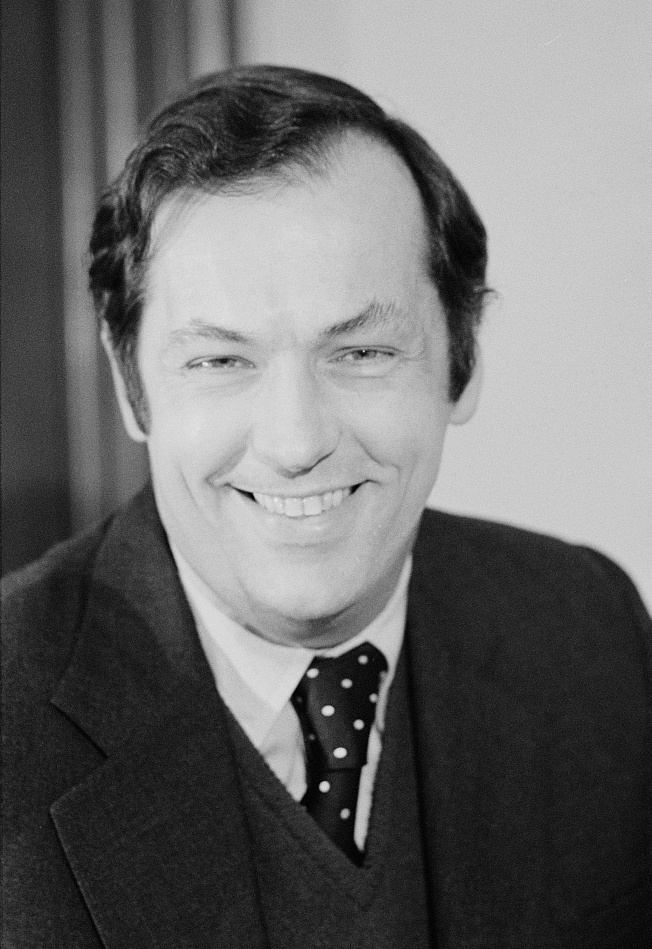
Bill Bradley

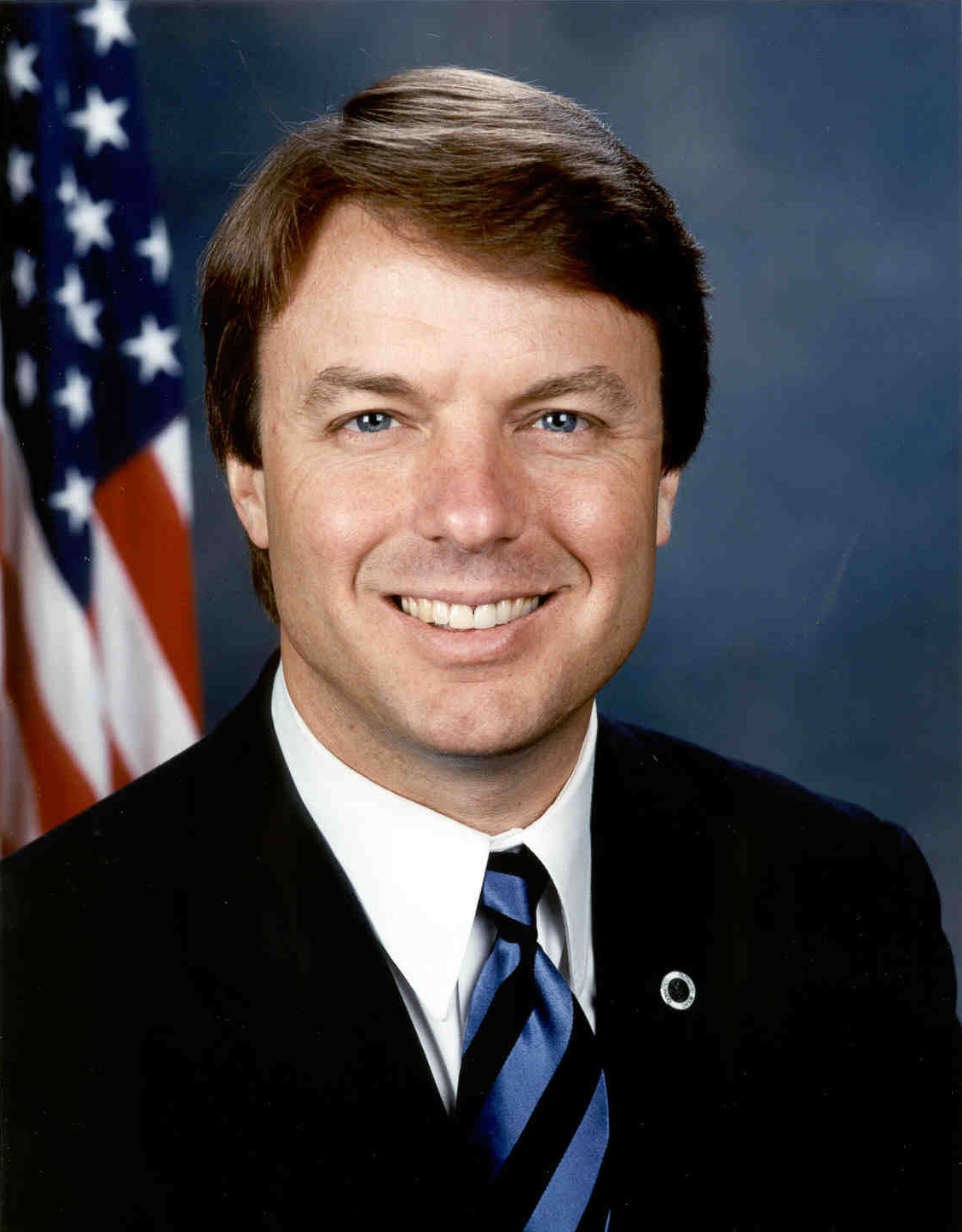
John Edwards

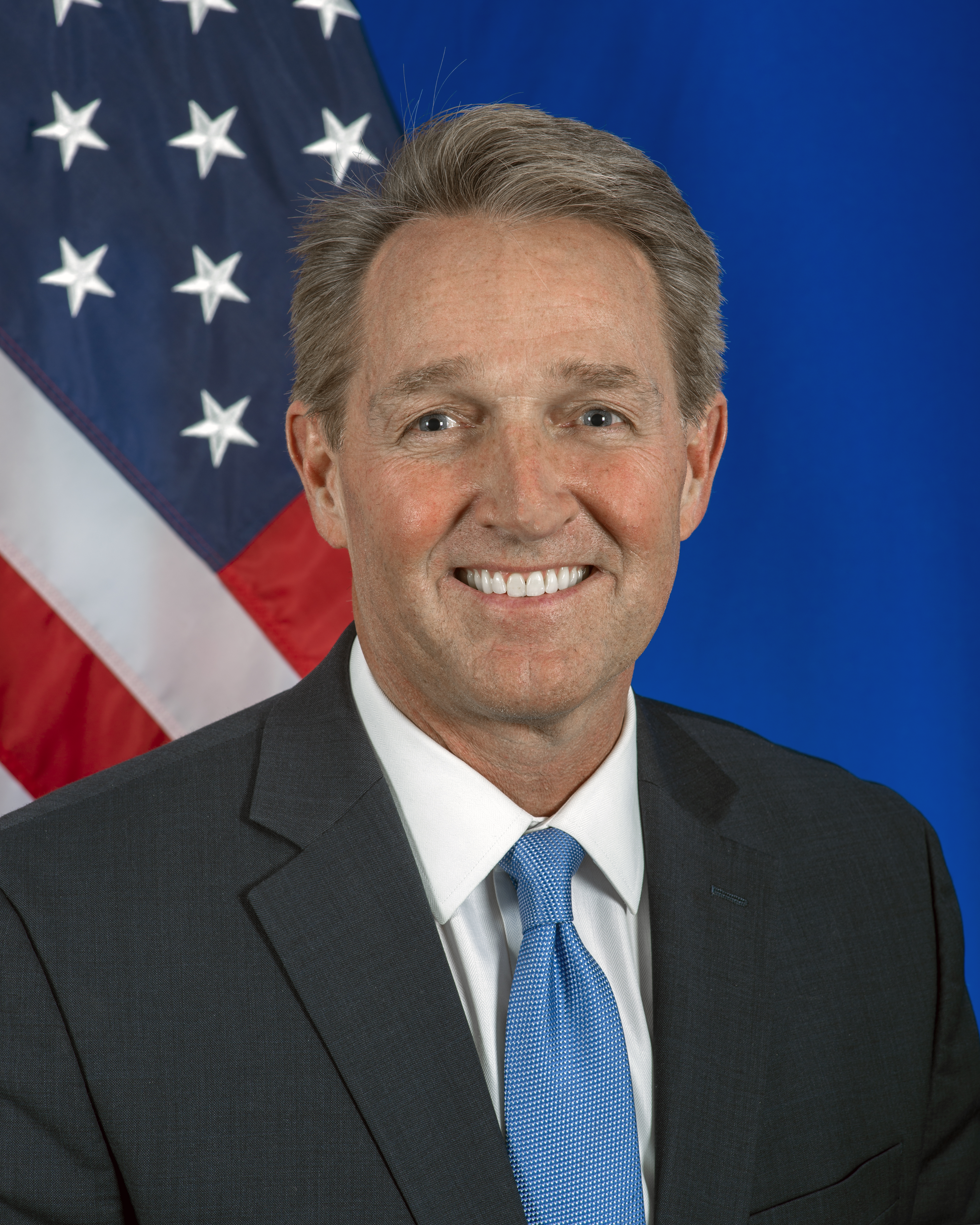
Jeff Flake

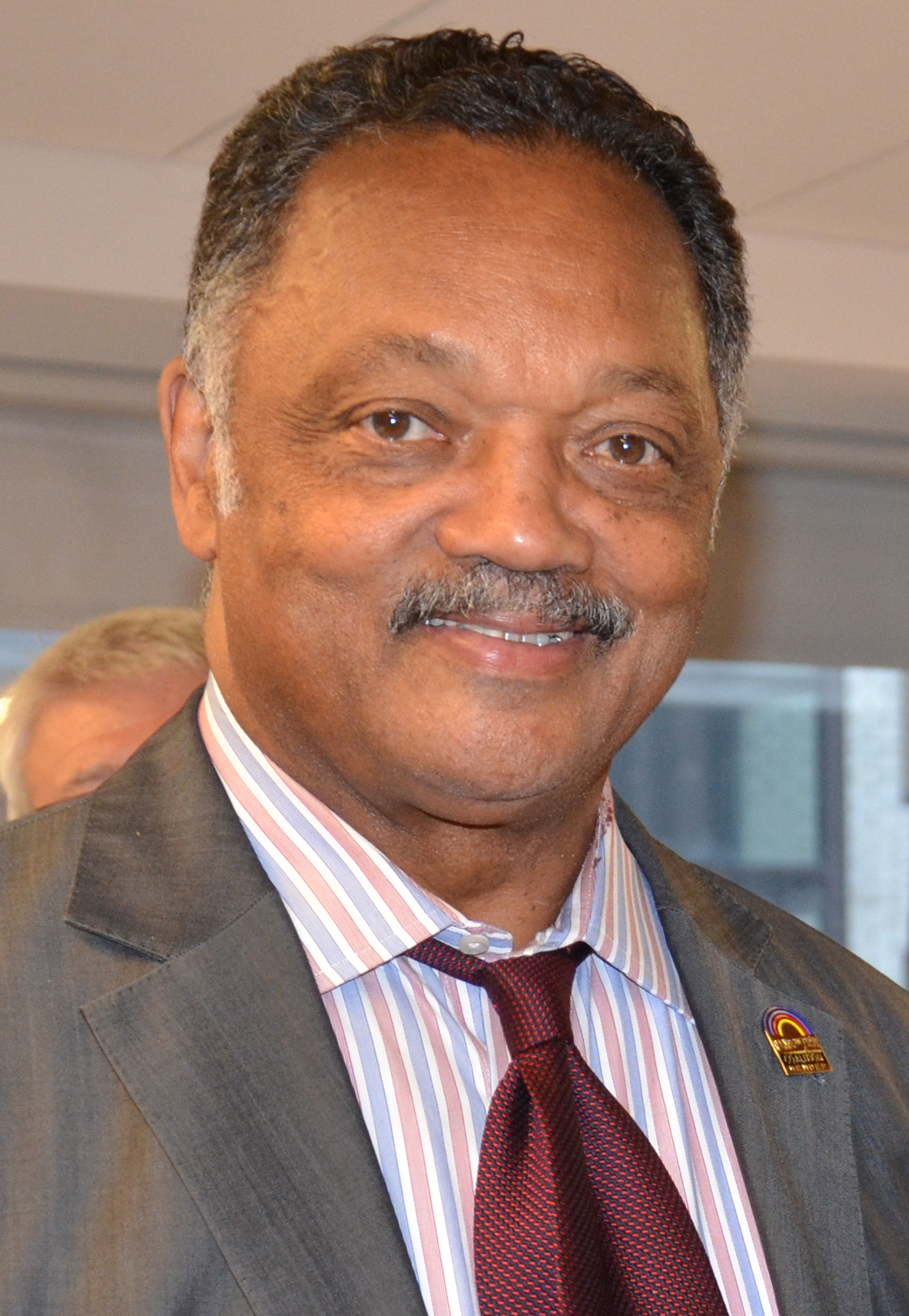
Jesse Jackson

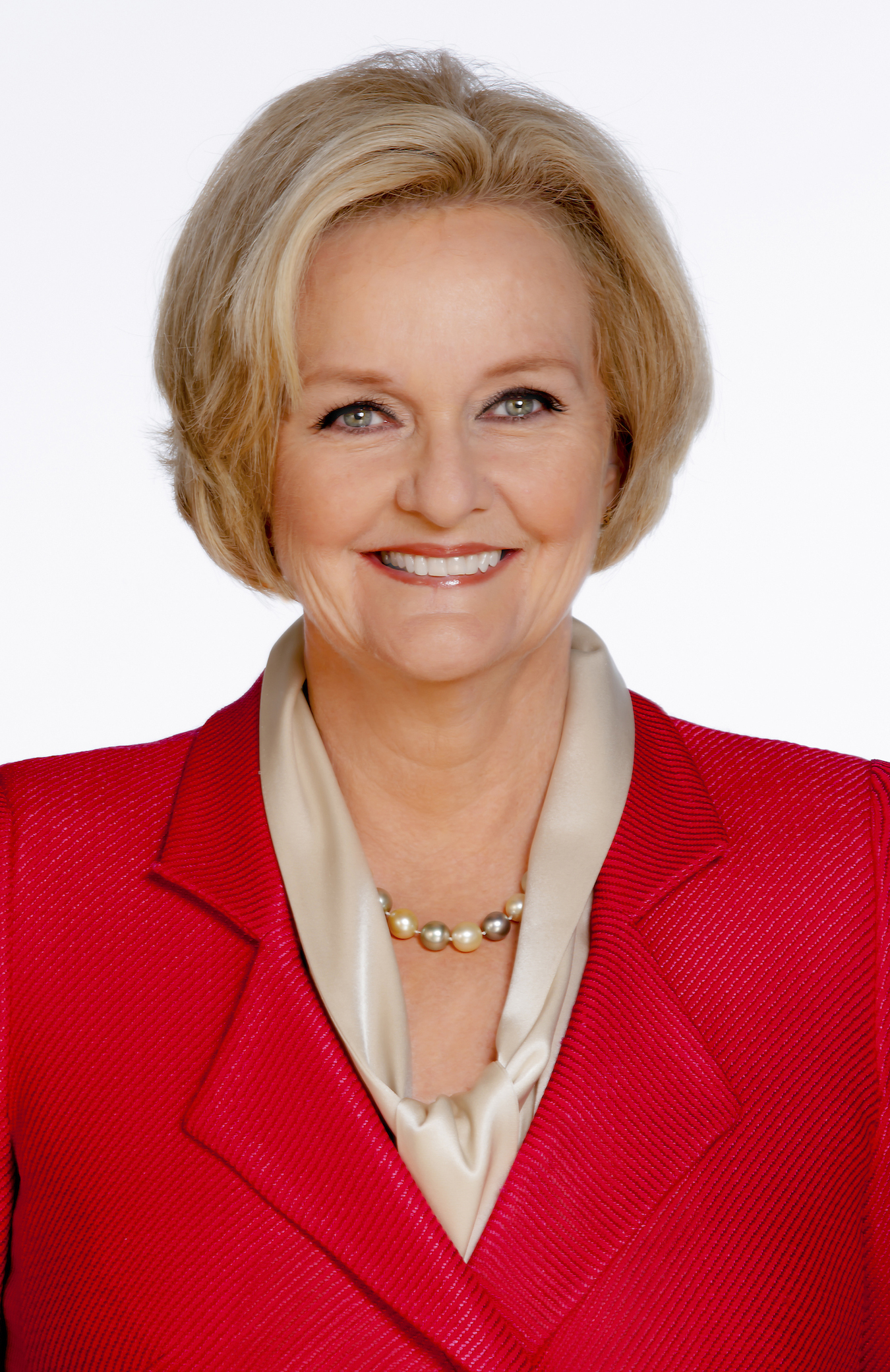
Claire McCaskill

- Mark Begich, Alaska (2009–2015)
- Bill Bradley, New Jersey (1979–1997)
- Barbara Boxer, California (1993–2017)
- Jon Corzine, New Jersey (2001–2006), Governor of New Jersey (2006–2010)
- Tom Daschle, South Dakota (1987–2005), Senate Majority Leader (2001, 2001–2003), Senate Minority Leader (1995–2001, 2001, 2003–2005)
- Mark Dayton, Minnesota (2001–2007), Governor of Minnesota (2011–2019)
- Chris Dodd, Connecticut (1981–2011)
- Byron Dorgan, North Dakota (1992–2011)
- John Edwards, North Carolina (1999–2005), 2004 Democratic nominee for vice president
- Jeff Flake, Arizona (2013–2019), U.S. ambassador to Turkey (2022–2024) (Republican)
- Al Franken, Minnesota (2009–2018)
- Tom Harkin, Iowa (1985–2015)
- Fred R. Harris, Oklahoma (1964–1973)
- Gary Hart, Colorado (1975–1987), United States Special Envoy for Northern Ireland (2014–2017)
- Heidi Heitkamp, North Dakota (2013–2019)
- Gordon J. Humphrey, New Hampshire (1979–1990) (Independent) (Note: Served office as a Republican.)
- Jesse Jackson, Shadow Senator from the District of Columbia (1991–1997), founder of Rainbow/PUSH, and civil rights activist
- Doug Jones, Alabama (2018–2021)
- Nancy Kassebaum, Kansas (1978–1997) (Republican)
- Ted Kaufman, Delaware (2009–2010)
- Bob Kerrey, Nebraska (1989–2001), Governor of Nebraska (1983–1987)
- Mary Landrieu, Louisiana (1997–2015)
- Patrick Leahy, Vermont (1975–2023), President pro tempore of the U.S. Senate (2012–2015, 2021–2023)
- Claire McCaskill, Missouri (2007–2019)
- Barbara Mikulski, Maryland (1987–2017)
- Ben Nelson, Nebraska (2001–2013), Governor of Nebraska (1991–1999)
- Mark Pryor, Arkansas (2003–2015)
- Tim Wirth, Colorado (1987–1993)

== U.S. representatives ==
207 of the 212 incumbent Democratic U.S. representatives and all incumbent non-voting Democratic U.S. representatives endorsed Harris.

=== Current ===
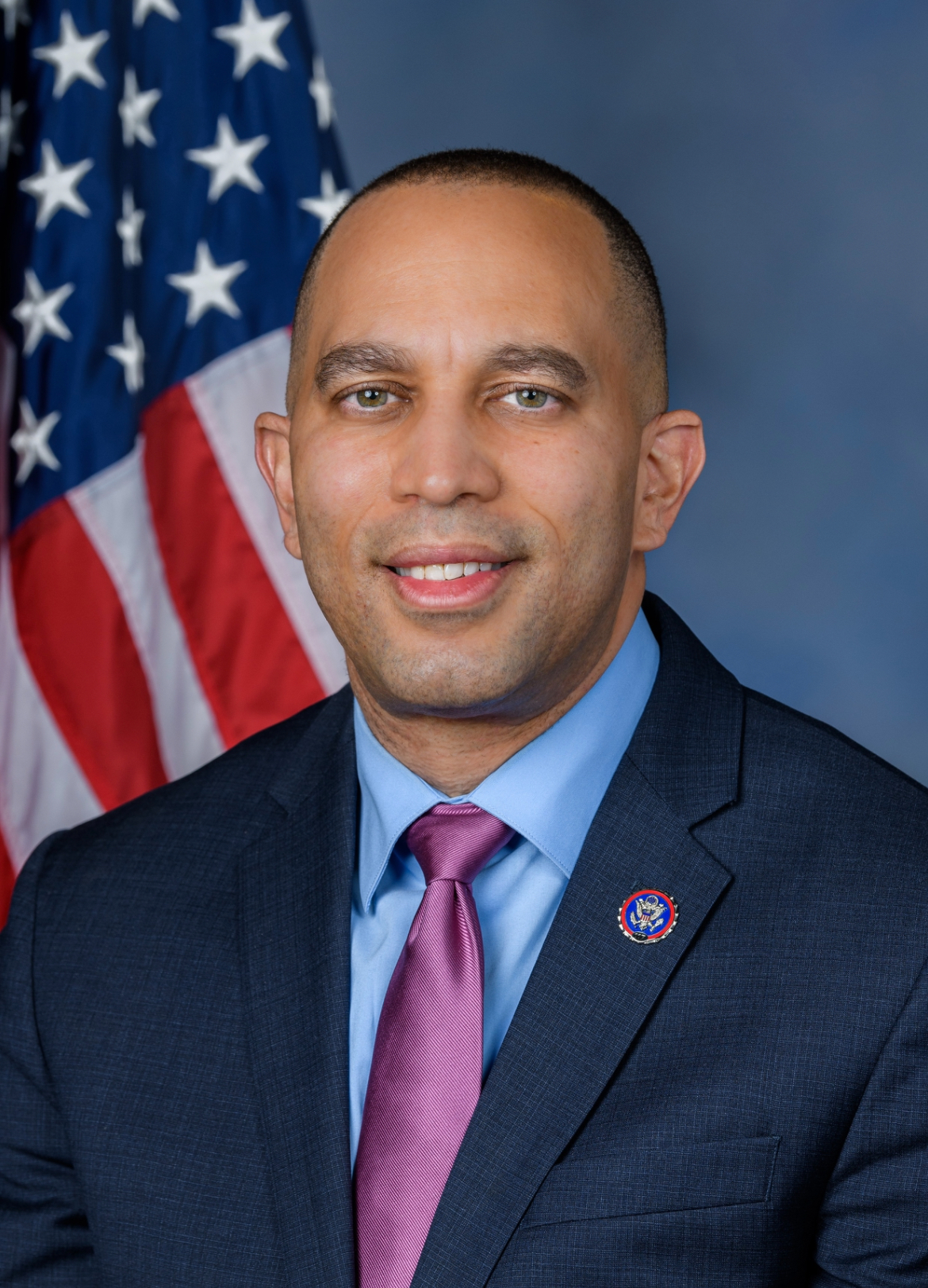
Hakeem Jeffries

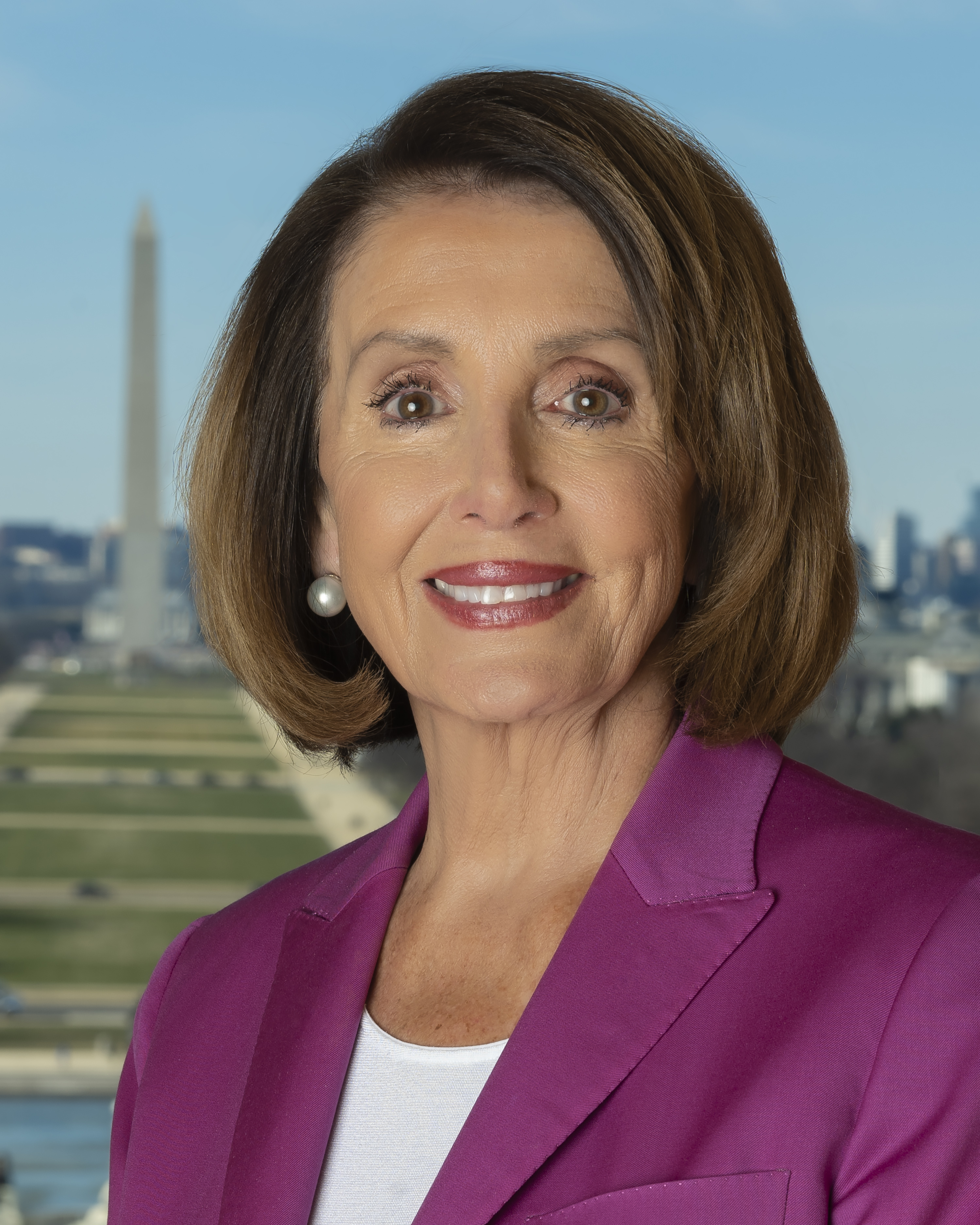
Nancy Pelosi

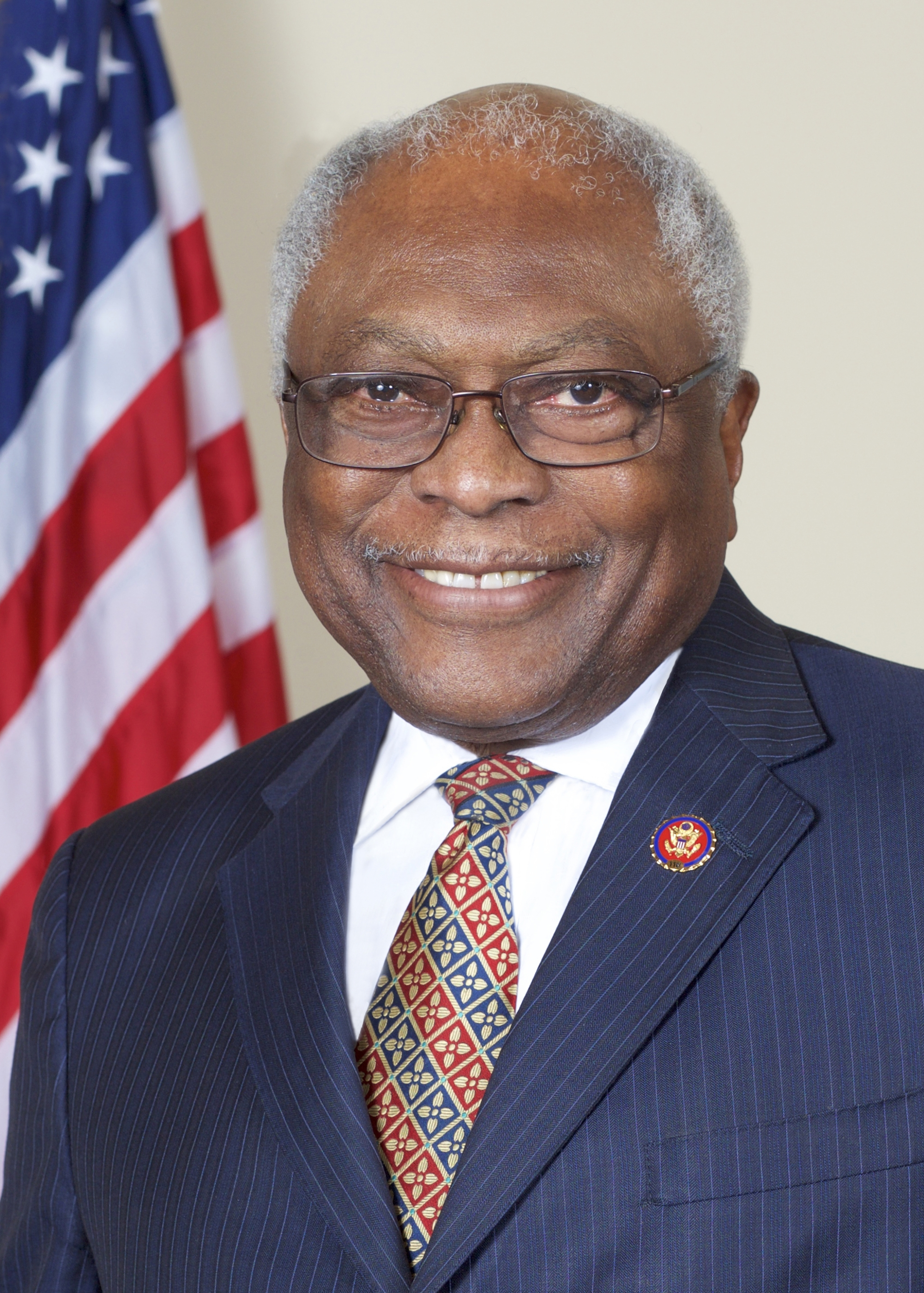
Jim Clyburn

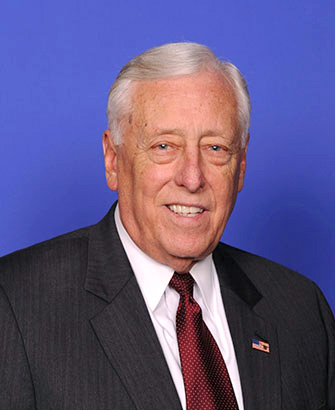
Steny Hoyer

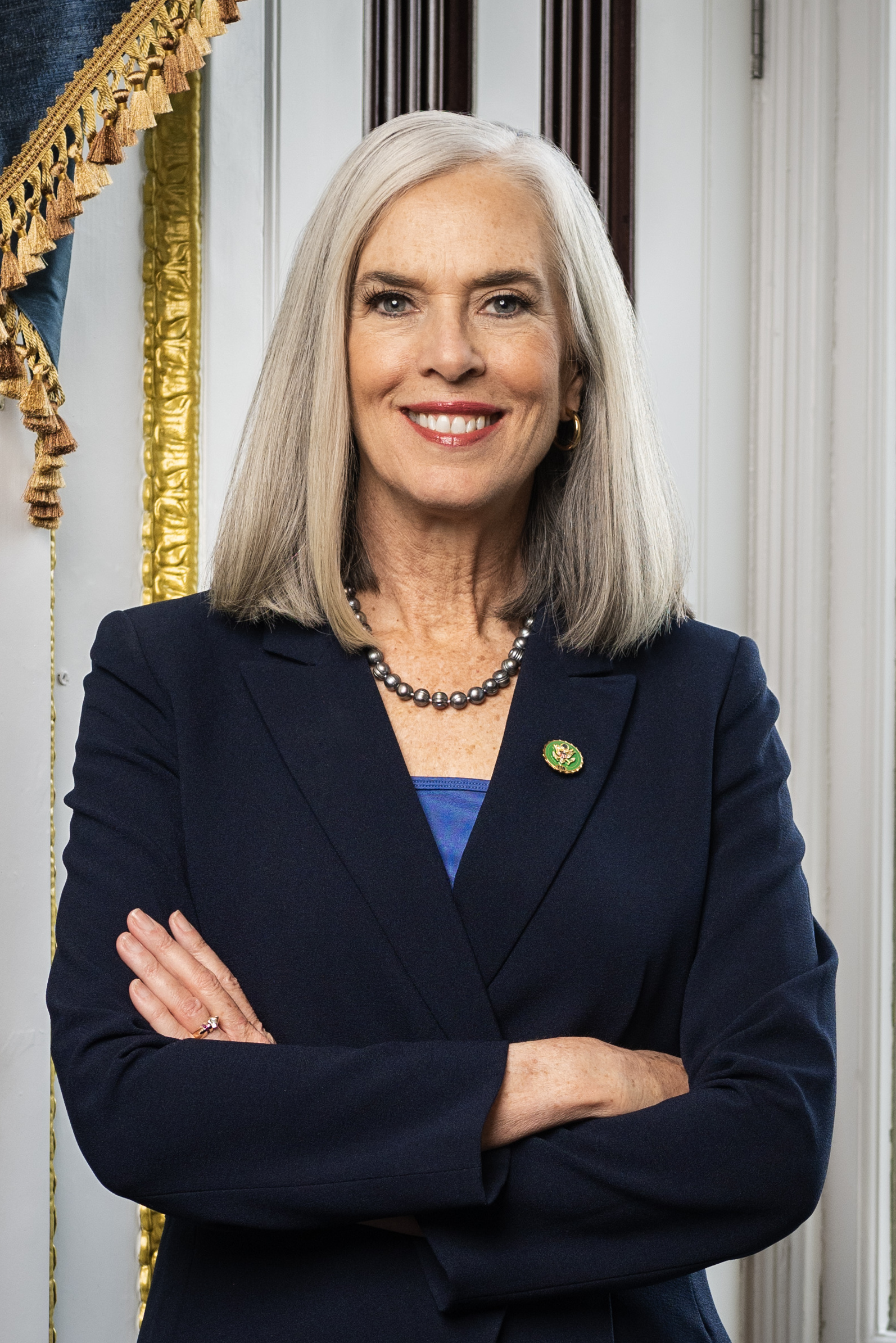
Katherine Clark

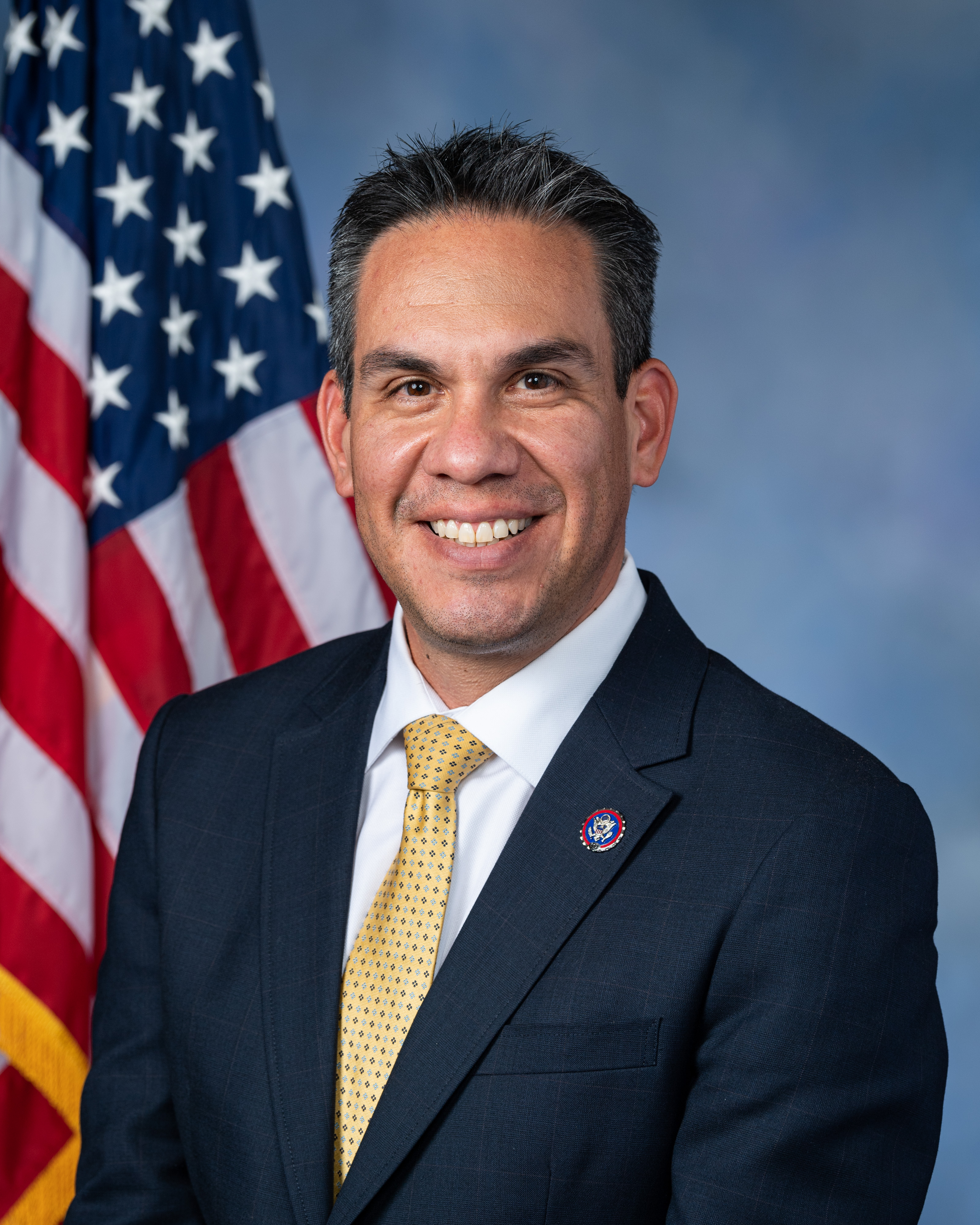
Pete Aguilar

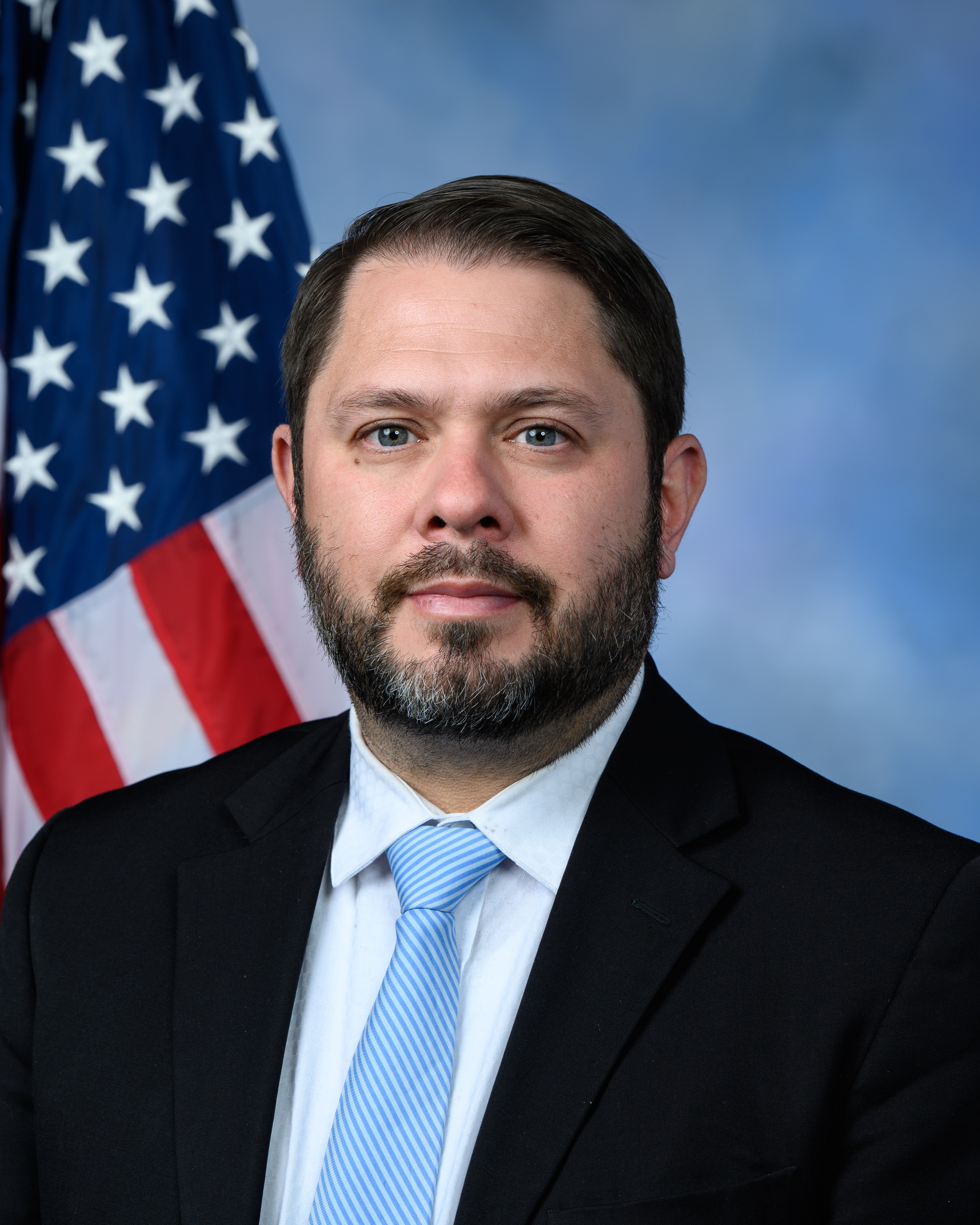
Ruben Gallego

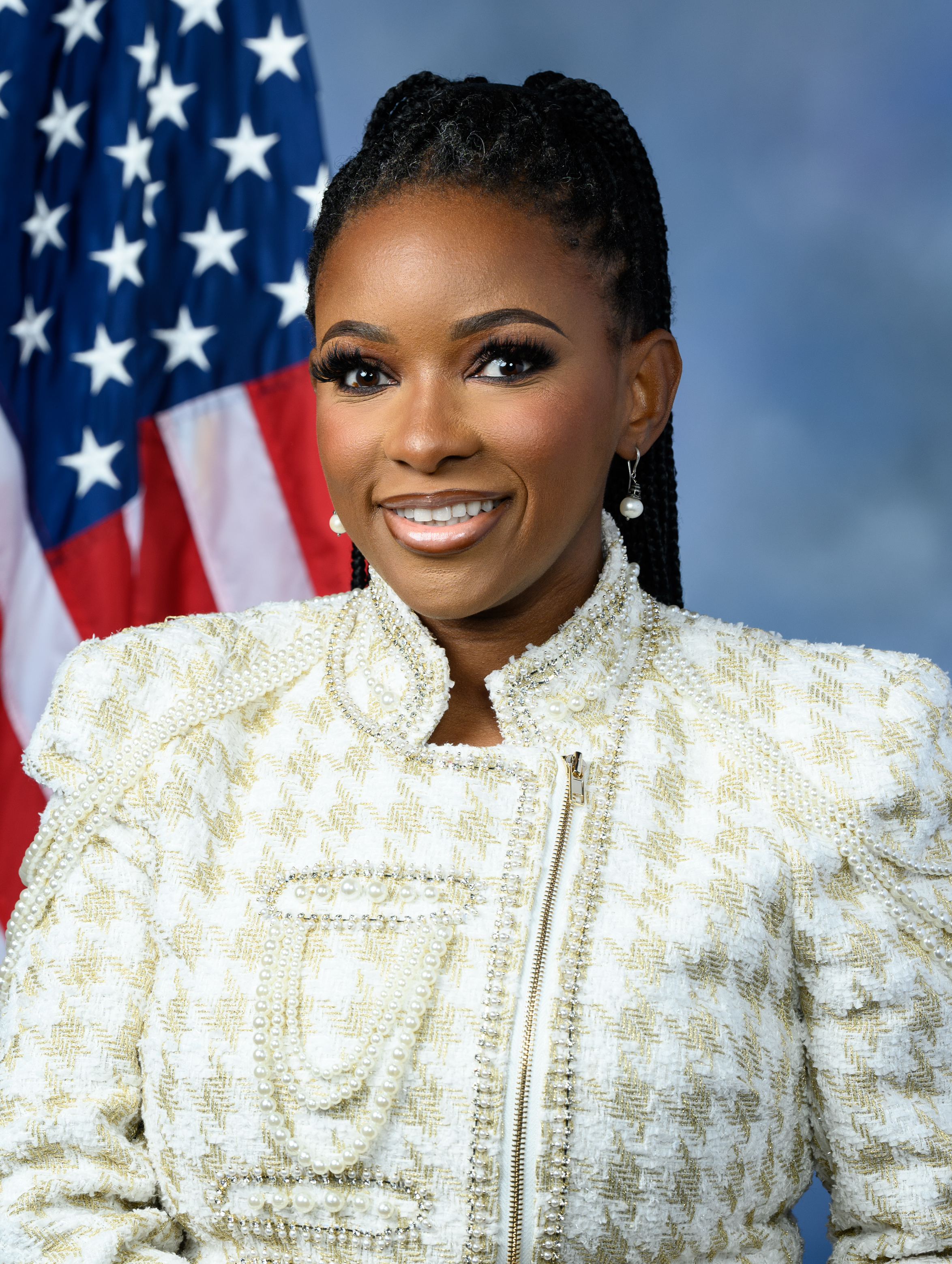
Jasmine Crockett

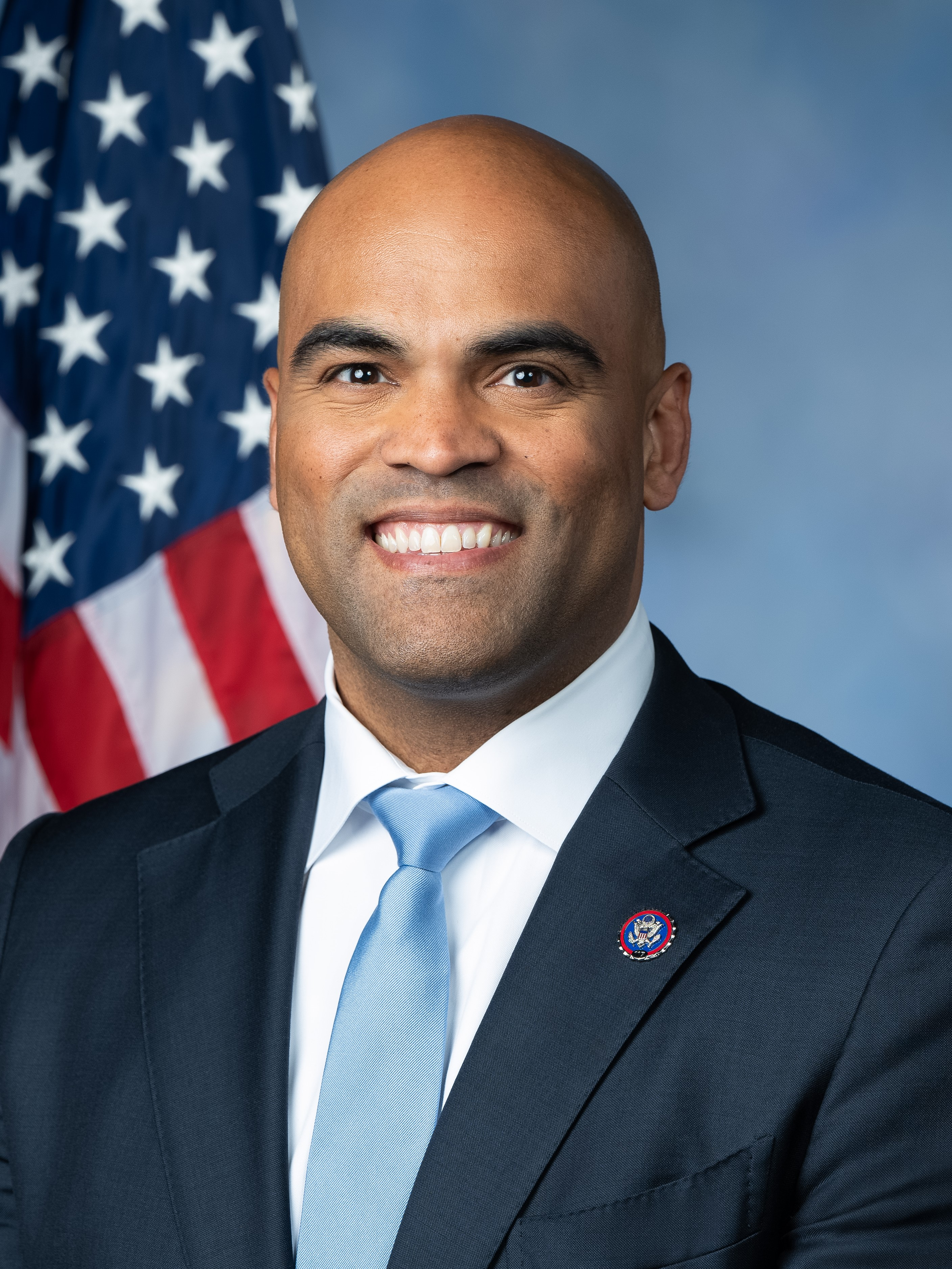
Colin Allred

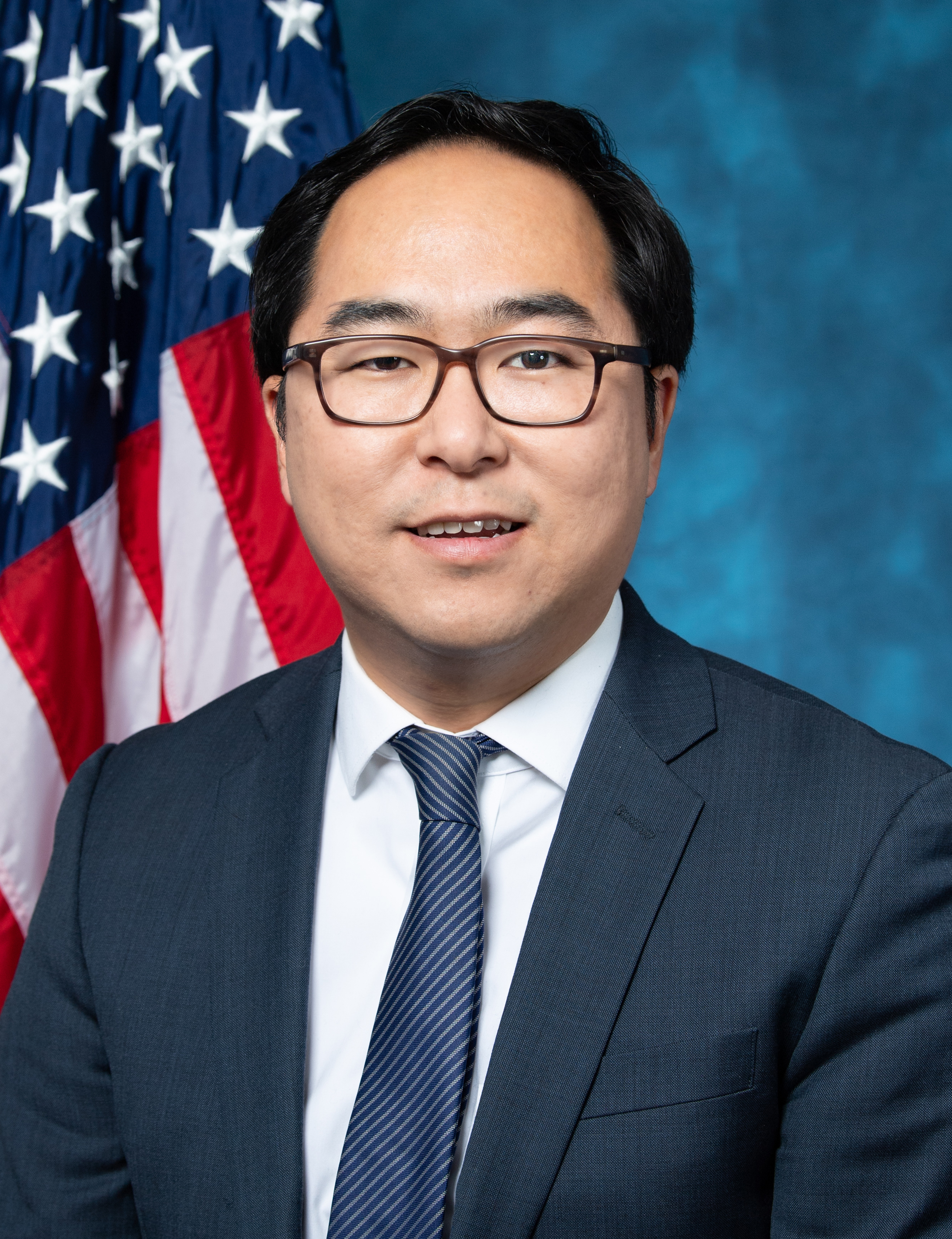
Andy Kim

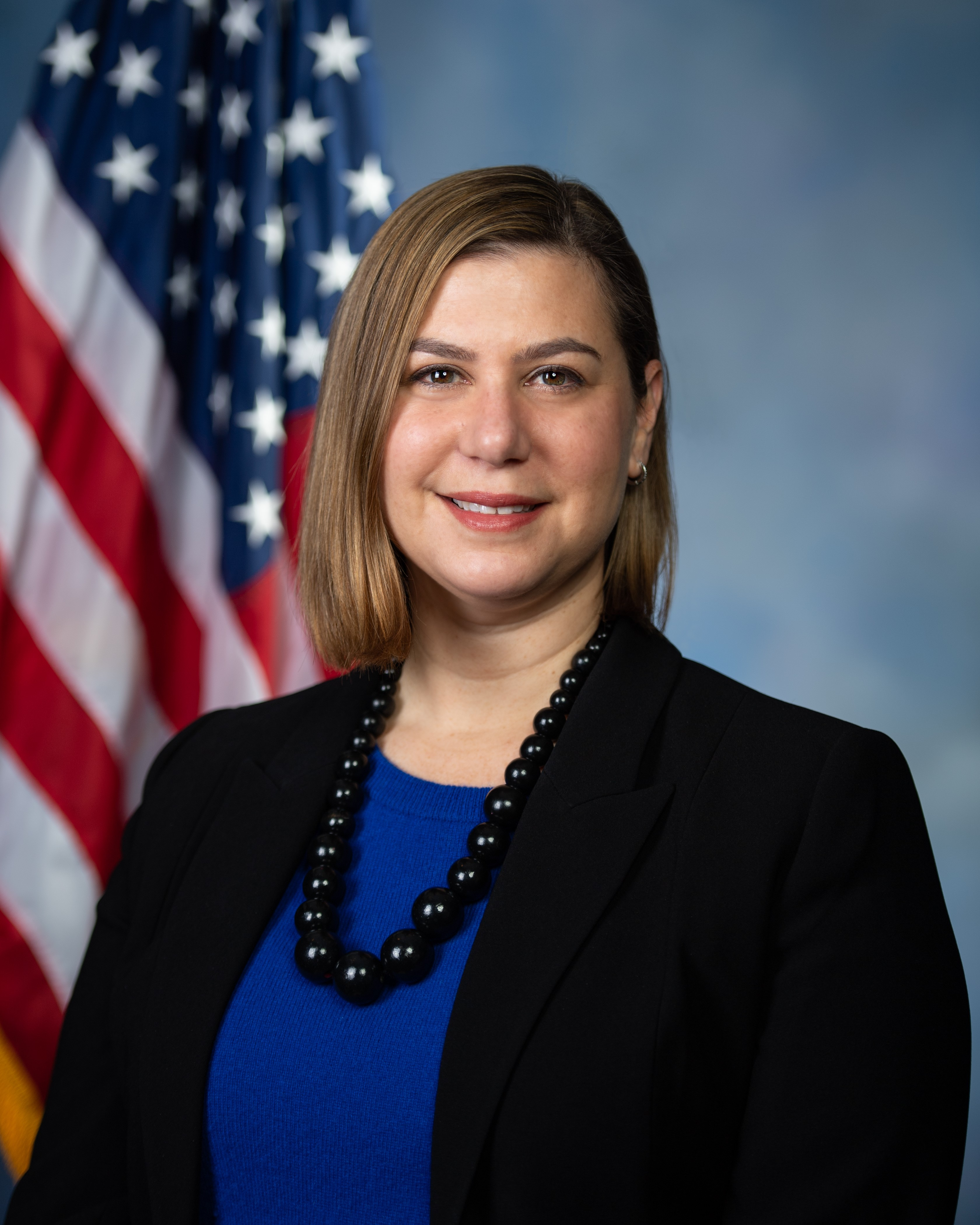
Elissa Slotkin

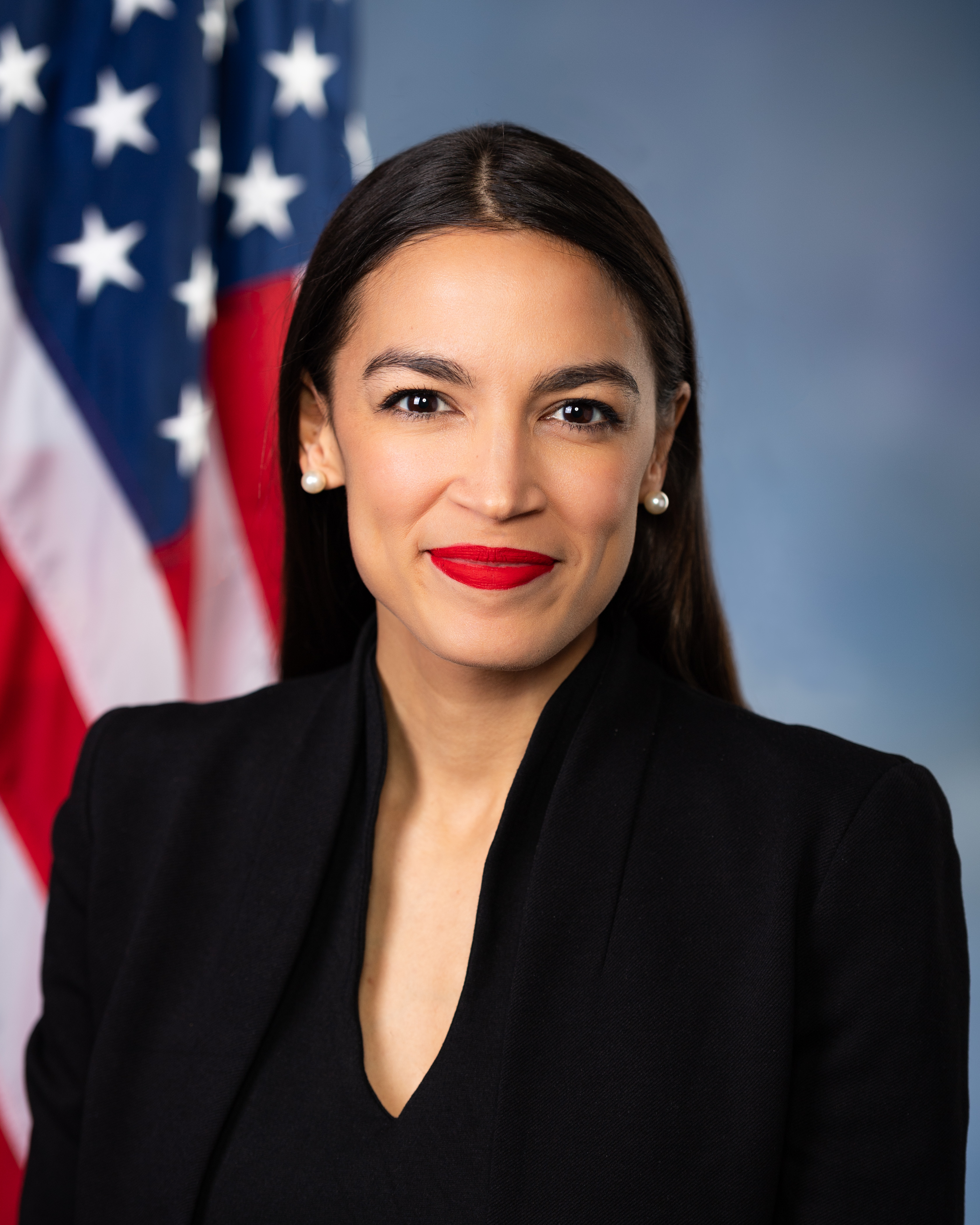
Alexandria Ocasio-Cortez

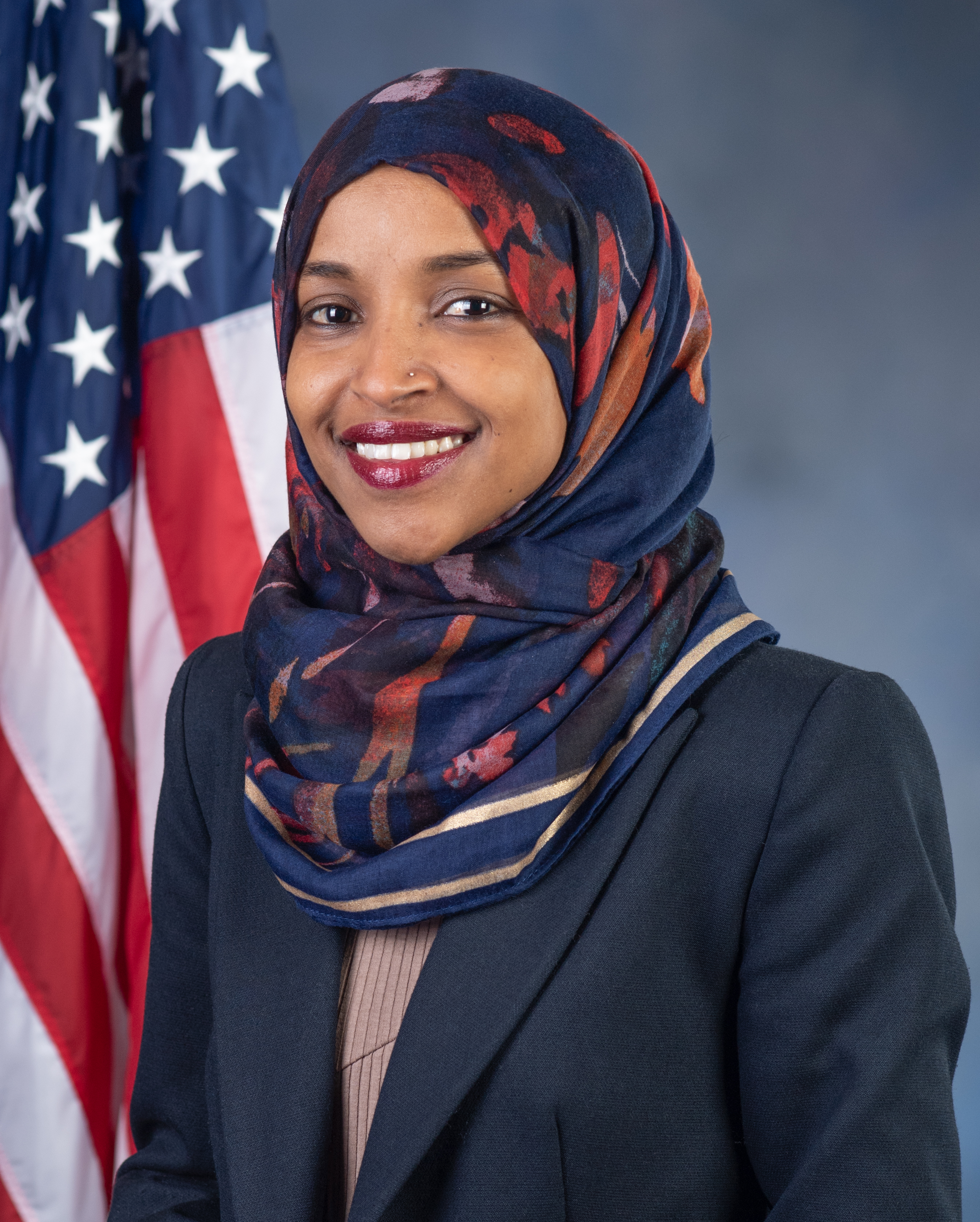
Ilhan Omar

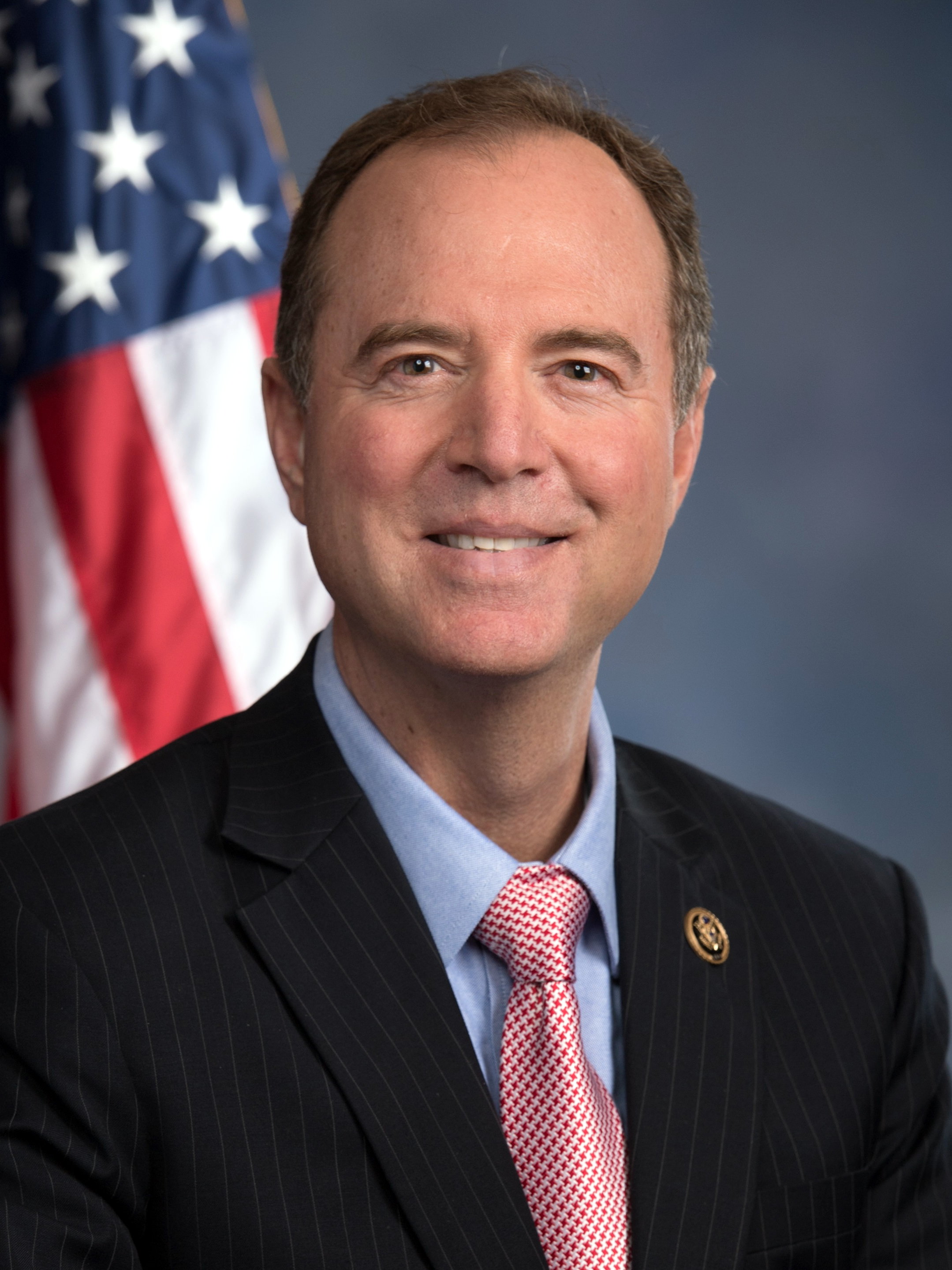
Adam Schiff

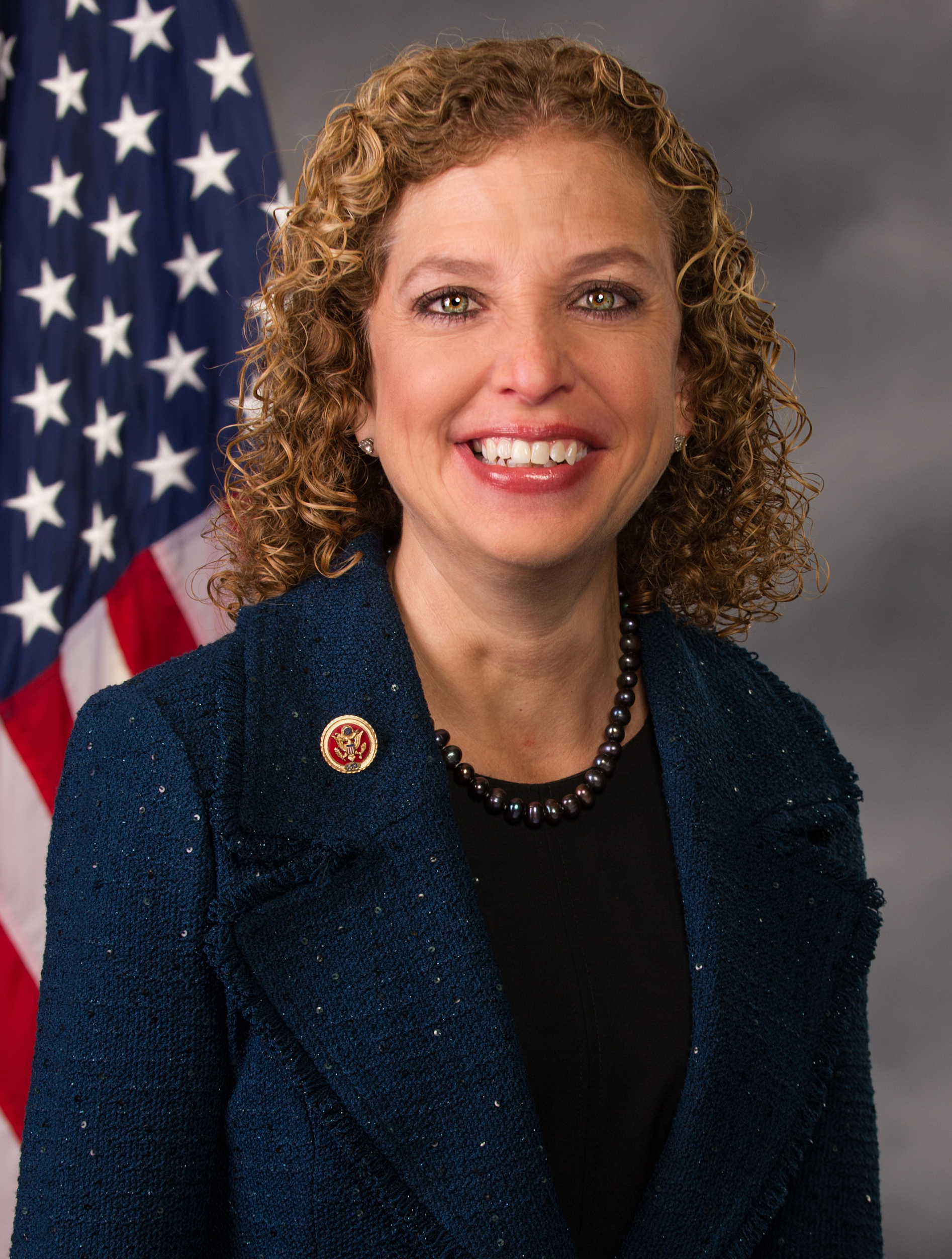
Debbie Wasserman Schultz

- Alma Adams, NC-12 (2014–present)
- Pete Aguilar, CA-33 (2015–present), Chair of the House Democratic Caucus
- Colin Allred, TX-32 (2019–2025), 2024 Democratic nominee for Senate
- Gabe Amo, RI-01 (2023–present)
- Jake Auchincloss, MA-04 (2021–present)
- Becca Balint, VT-AL (2023–present)
- Nanette Barragán, CA-44 (2017–present)
- Joyce Beatty, OH-03 (2013–present)
- Ami Bera, CA-06 (2013–present)
- Don Beyer, VA-08 (2015–present)
- Sanford Bishop, GA-02 (1993–present)
- Earl Blumenauer, OR-03 (1996–2025)
- Lisa Blunt Rochester, DE-AL (2017–2025), 2024 Democratic nominee for Senate
- Suzanne Bonamici, OR-01 (2012–present)
- Jamaal Bowman, NY-16 (2021–2025)
- Brendan Boyle, PA-02 (2015–present)
- Shontel Brown, OH-11 (2021–present)
- Julia Brownley, CA-26 (2013–present)
- Nikki Budzinski, IL-13 (2023–present)
- Cori Bush, MO-01 (2023–2025)
- Yadira Caraveo, CO-08 (2023–2025)
- Salud Carbajal, CA-24 (2017–present)
- Tony Cárdenas, CA-29 (2013–2025)
- André Carson, IN-07 (2008–present)
- Troy Carter, LA-02 (2021–present)
- Matt Cartwright, PA-08 (2013–2025)
- Greg Casar, TX-35 (2023–present)
- Ed Case, HI-01 (2019–present), HI-02 (2002–2007)
- Sean Casten, IL-06 (2019–present)
- Kathy Castor, FL-14 (2013–present), FL-11 (2007–2013)
- Joaquin Castro, TX-20 (2013–present)
- Sheila Cherfilus-McCormick, FL-20 (2022–2026)
- Judy Chu, CA-28 (2009–present)
- Katherine Clark, MA-05 (2013–present), House Minority Whip (2023–present)
- Yvette Clarke, NY-09 (2007–present)
- Emanuel Cleaver, MO-05 (2005–present)
- Jim Clyburn, SC-06 (1993–present), Vice Chair of the House Democratic Caucus (2003–2007), Chair of the House Democratic Caucus (2006–2007), House Majority Whip (2007–2011; 2019–2023), House Assistant Democratic Leader (2011–2019; 2023–2024)
- Steve Cohen, TN-09 (2007–present)
- Gerry Connolly, VA-11 (2009–2025)
- Lou Correa, CA-46 (2017–present)
- Jim Costa, CA-21 (2023–present), CA-16 (2013–2023), CA-20 (2005–2013)
- Joe Courtney, CT-02 (2007–present)
- Angie Craig, MN-02 (2019–present)
- Jasmine Crockett, TX-30 (2023–present)
- Jason Crow, CO-06 (2019–present)
- Henry Cuellar, TX-28 (2005–present)
- Sharice Davids, KS-03 (2019–present)
- Danny Davis, IL-07 (1997–present)
- Don Davis, NC-01 (2023–present)
- Madeleine Dean, PA-04 (2018–present)
- Diana DeGette, CO-01 (1997–present)
- Rosa DeLauro, CT-03 (1991–present)
- Suzan DelBene, WA-01 (2012–present)
- Chris Deluzio, PA-17, (2023–present)
- Mark DeSaulnier, CA-10 (2015–present)
- Debbie Dingell, MI-06 (2015–present)
- Lloyd Doggett, TX-37 (1995–present)
- Veronica Escobar, TX-16 (2019–present)
- Anna Eshoo, CA-16 (1993–2025)
- Adriano Espaillat, NY-13 (2017–present)
- Dwight Evans, PA-03 (2016–present)
- Lizzie Fletcher, TX-07 (2019–present)
- Bill Foster, IL-11 (2013–present), IL-14 (2008–2011)
- Valerie Foushee, NC-04 (2023–present)
- Lois Frankel, FL-22 (2013–2017, 2023–present), FL-21 (2017-2023)
- Maxwell Alejandro Frost, FL-10 (2023–present)
- Ruben Gallego, AZ-03 (2023–2025), AZ-07 (2015–2023), 2024 Democratic nominee for Senate
- John Garamendi, CA-08 (2009–present)
- Chuy García, IL-04 (2019–present)
- Robert Garcia, CA-42 (2023–present)
- Sylvia Garcia, TX-29 (2019–present)
- Dan Goldman, NY-10 (2023–present)
- Jimmy Gomez, CA-34 (2017–present)
- Vicente Gonzalez, TX-34 (2023–present), TX-15 (2017–2023)
- Josh Gottheimer, NJ-05 (2017–present)
- Al Green, TX-09 (2005–present)
- Raúl Grijalva, AZ-07 (2003–2013, 2023–2025), AZ-03 (2013–2023)
- Jahana Hayes, CT-05 (2019–present)
- Jim Himes, CT-04 (2009–present)
- Steven Horsford, NV-04 (2013–2015; 2019–present), Chair of the Congressional Black Caucus
- Chrissy Houlahan, PA-06 (2019–present)
- Steny Hoyer, MD-05 (1981–present), House Majority Leader (2007–2011; 2019–2023), House Minority Whip (2003–2007; 2011–2019)
- Val Hoyle, OR-04 (2023–present)
- Jared Huffman, CA-02 (2013–present)
- Glenn Ivey, MD-04 (2023–present)
- Jeff Jackson, NC-14 (2023–2025), Democratic nominee for Attorney General of North Carolina in 2024
- Jonathan Jackson, IL-01 (2023–present)
- Sara Jacobs, CA-53 (2023–present), CA-51 (2021–2023)
- Pramila Jayapal, WA-07 (2017–present), Chair of the Congressional Progressive Caucus (2021–present)
- Hakeem Jeffries, NY-08 (2013–present), House Minority Leader (2023–present)
- Hank Johnson, GA-04 (2007–present)
- Sydney Kamlager-Dove, CA-37 (2023–present)
- Marcy Kaptur, OH-09 (1983–present)
- Bill Keating, MA-09 (2013–present), MA-10 (2011–2013)
- Robin Kelly, IL-02 (2013–present)
- Tim Kennedy, NY-26 (2024–present)
- Ro Khanna, CA-17 (2017–present)
- Dan Kildee, MI-08 (2023–2025), MI-05 (2013–2023)
- Derek Kilmer, WA-06 (2013–2025)
- Andy Kim, NJ-03 (2019–2024), 2024 Democratic nominee for Senate
- Raja Krishnamoorthi, IL-08 (2017–present)
- Annie Kuster, NH-02 (2013–2025), Chair of the New Democrat Coalition (2023–present)
- Greg Landsman, OH-01 (2023–present)
- Rick Larsen, WA-02 (2001–present)
- John B. Larson, CT-01 (1999–present)
- Barbara Lee, CA-12 (1998–2025)
- Summer Lee, PA-12 (2023–present)
- Susie Lee, NV-03 (2019–present)
- Teresa Leger Fernandez, NM-03 (2021–present)
- Mike Levin, CA-49 (2019–present)
- Ted Lieu, CA-36 (2023–present), CA-33 (2015–2023), Vice Chair of the House Democratic Caucus (2023–present)
- Zoe Lofgren, CA-18 (1995–present)
- Stephen Lynch, MA-08 (2013–present), MA-09 (2001–2013)
- Seth Magaziner, RI-02 (2023–present)
- Kathy Manning, NC-06 (2021–2025)
- Doris Matsui, CA-07 (2005–present)
- Lucy McBath, GA-07 (2019–present)
- Jennifer McClellan, VA-04 (2023–present)
- Betty McCollum, MN-04 (2001–present)
- Morgan McGarvey, KY-03 (2023–present)
- James McGovern, MA-02 (1997–present)
- LaMonica McIver, NJ-10 (2024–present)
- Gregory Meeks, NY-05 (1998–present)
- Rob Menendez, NJ-08 (2023–present)
- Grace Meng, NY-06 (2013–present)
- Kweisi Mfume, MD-07 (1987–1996, 2020–present)
- Gwen Moore, WI-04 (2005–present)
- Joe Morelle, NY-25, (2018–present)
- Jared Moskowitz, FL-23 (2023–present)
- Seth Moulton, MA-06, (2015–present), 2020 candidate for the Democratic nomination for president
- Frank J. Mrvan, IN-01 (2021–present)
- Kevin Mullin, CA-15 (2023–present)
- Jerry Nadler, NY-12 (1992–present)
- Grace Napolitano, CA-31 (2023–2025), CA-32 (2013–2023), CA-38 (2003–2013), CA-34 (1999–2003)
- Richard Neal, MA-01 (1989–present)
- Joe Neguse, CO-02 (2019–present)
- Wiley Nickel, NC-13 (2023–2025)
- Donald Norcross, NJ-01 (2014–present)
- Alexandria Ocasio-Cortez, NY-14 (2019–present)
- Ilhan Omar, MN-05 (2019–present)
- Frank Pallone, NJ-06 (1988–present)
- Jimmy Panetta, CA-19 (2017–present)
- Chris Pappas, NH-01 (2019–present)
- Nancy Pelosi, CA-11 (1987–present), Speaker of the House of Representatives (2007–2011; 2019–2023), House Minority Leader (2003–2007; 2011–2019)
- Scott Peters, CA-50 (2013–present)
- Brittany Pettersen, CO-07 (2023–present)
- Dean Phillips, MN-03 (2019–2025), 2024 candidate for the Democratic nomination for president
- Chellie Pingree, ME-01 (2009–present)
- Mark Pocan, WI-02 (2013–present)
- Katie Porter, CA-47 (2019–2025)
- Ayanna Pressley, MA-07 (2019–present)
- Mike Quigley, IL-05 (2009–present)
- Delia Ramirez, IL-03 (2023–present)
- Jamie Raskin, MD-08 (2017–present)
- Deborah Ross, NC-02 (2021–present)
- Raul Ruiz, CA-25 (2013–present)
- Dutch Ruppersberger, MD-02 (2003–2025)
- Pat Ryan, NY-18 (2023–present)
- Andrea Salinas, OR-06 (2023–present)
- Linda Sánchez, CA-38 (2003–present)
- John Sarbanes, MD-03 (2007–2025)
- Mary Gay Scanlon, PA-05 (2018–present)
- Jan Schakowsky, IL-09 (1999–present)
- Adam Schiff, CA-30 (2023–2024), CA-28 (2013–2023), CA-29 (2003–2013), CA-27 (2001–2003), 2024 Democratic candidate for Senate
- Brad Schneider, IL-10 (2013–2015, 2017–present)
- Hillary Scholten, MI-03 (2023–present)
- Kim Schrier, WA-08 (2019–present)
- Bobby Scott, VA-03 (1993–present)
- David Scott, GA-13 (2003–present)
- Terri Sewell, AL-07 (2011–present)
- Brad Sherman, CA-32 (1997–present)
- Mikie Sherrill, NJ-11 (2019–2025)
- Elissa Slotkin, MI-07 (2019–2025), 2024 Democratic nominee for Senate
- Adam Smith, WA-09 (1997–present)
- Eric Sorensen, IL-17 (2023–present)
- Darren Soto, FL-09 (2017–present)
- Abigail Spanberger, VA-07 (2019–2025)
- Greg Stanton, AZ-04 (2019–present)
- Melanie Stansbury, NM-01 (2021–present)
- Haley Stevens, MI-11 (2019–present)
- Marilyn Strickland, WA-10 (2021–present)
- Tom Suozzi, NY-03 (2024–present; 2017–2023)
- Eric Swalwell, CA-14 (2013–present), 2020 candidate for the Democratic nomination for president
- Emilia Sykes, OH-13 (2023–present)
- Mark Takano, CA-39 (2013–present)
- Shri Thanedar, MI-13 (2023–present)
- Bennie Thompson, MS-02 (1993–present)
- Mike Thompson, CA-04 (1999–present)
- Dina Titus, NV-01 (2013–present)
- Jill Tokuda, HI-02 (2023–present)
- Paul Tonko, NY-20 (2009–present)
- Norma Torres, CA-35 (2015–present)
- Ritchie Torres, NY-15 (2021–present)
- Lori Trahan, MA-03 (2019–present)
- David Trone, MD-06 (2019–2025)
- Lauren Underwood, IL-14 (2023–present)
- Juan Vargas, CA-52 (2013–present)
- Gabe Vasquez, NM-02 (2023–present)
- Marc Veasey, TX-33 (2013–present)
- Nydia Velázquez, NY-07, (2013–present)
- Debbie Wasserman Schultz, FL-25 (2005–present), Chair of the Democratic National Committee (2011–2016)
- Maxine Waters, CA-43 (1991–present)
- Bonnie Watson Coleman, NJ-12 (2015–present)
- Jennifer Wexton, VA-10 (2019–2025)
- Susan Wild, PA-07 (2018–2025)
- Nikema Williams, GA-05 (2021–present); Chair of Democratic Party of Georgia (acting 2013; 2019–2025)
- Frederica Wilson, FL-24 (2013–present), FL-17 (2011–2013)

=== Non-voting delegates ===
- Eleanor Holmes Norton, DC-AL (1991–present)
- Stacey Plaskett, VI-AL (2015–present)
- Gregorio Sablan, CNMI-AL (2009–2025)

=== Former ===
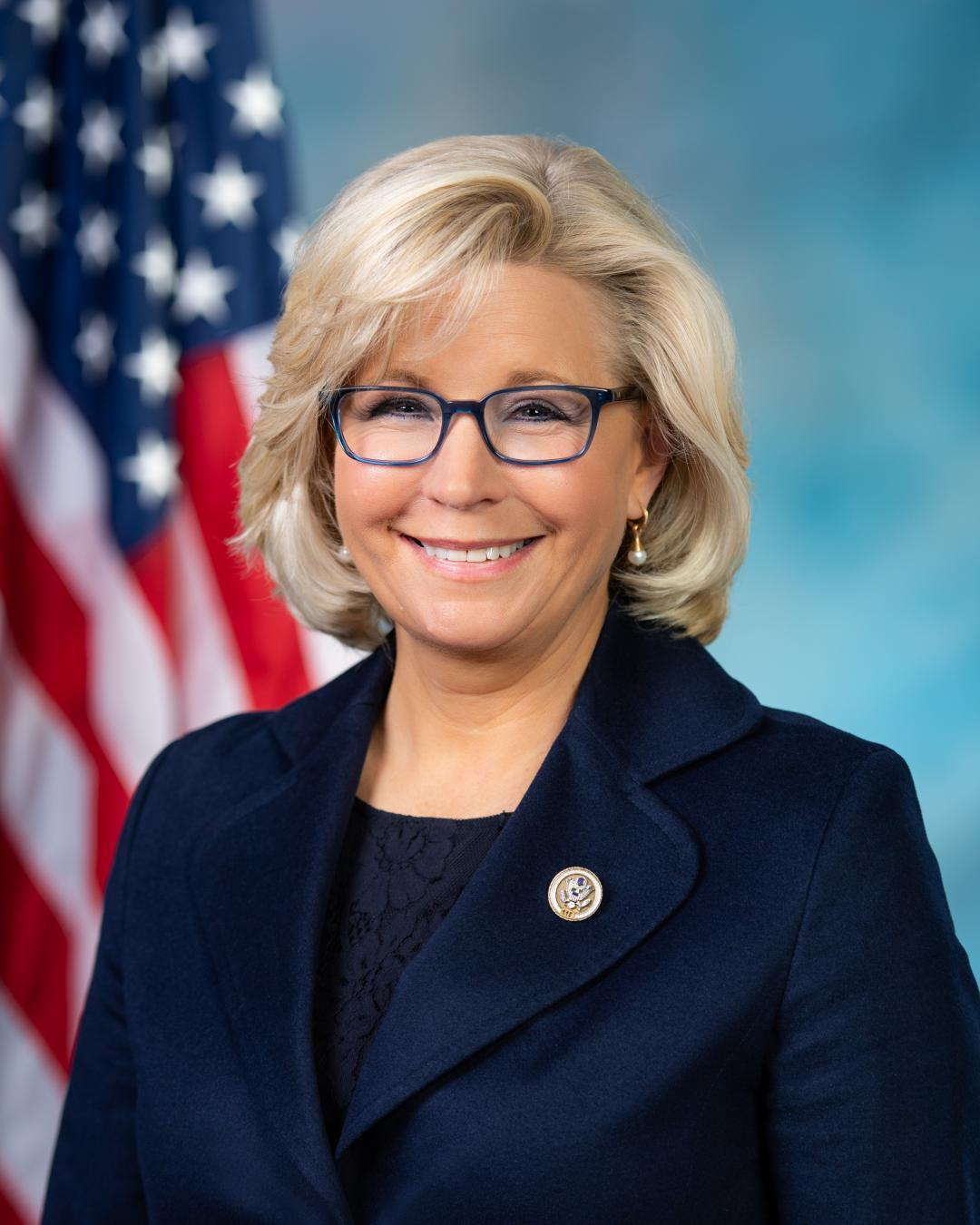
Liz Cheney

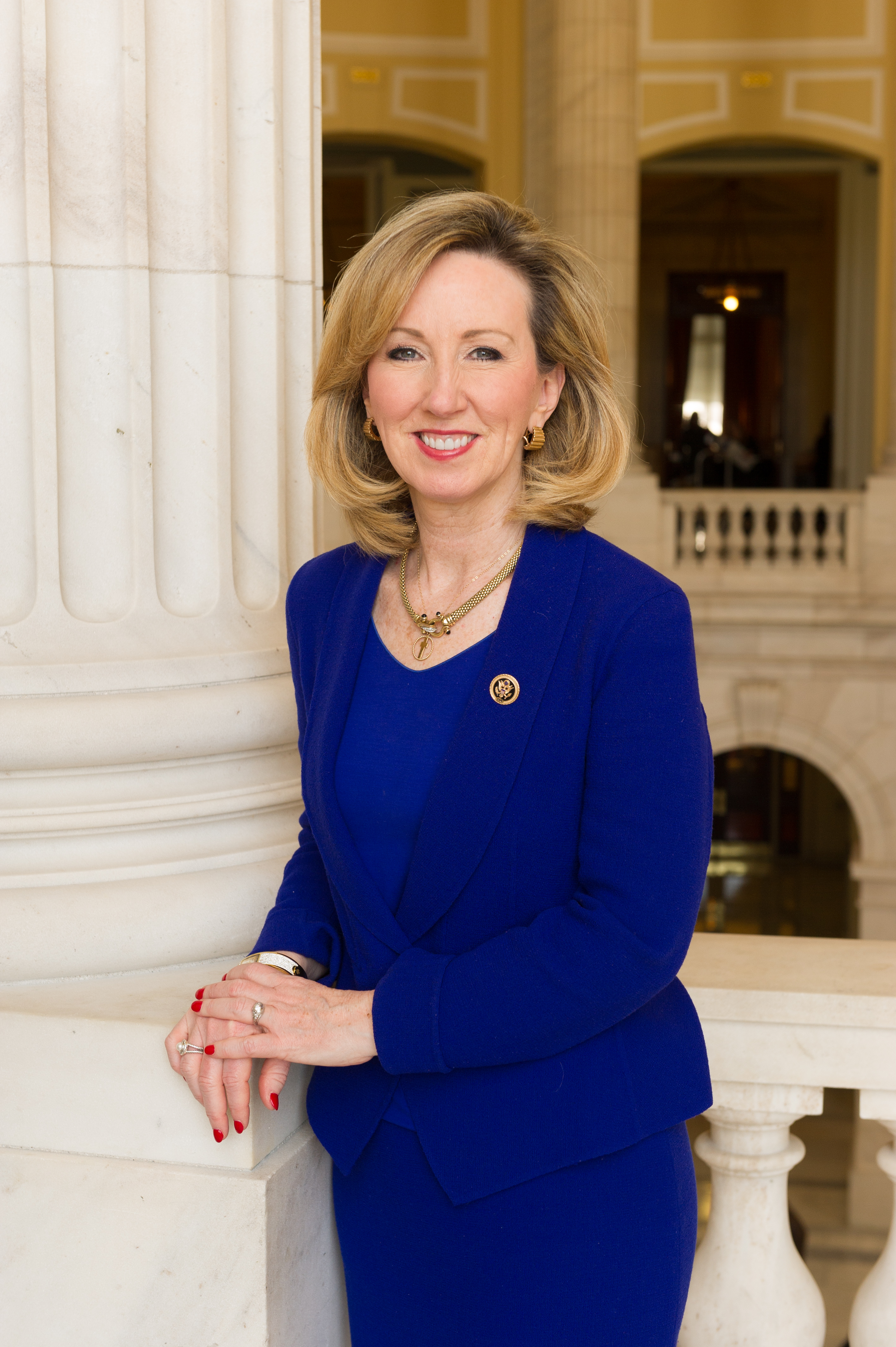
Barbara Comstock

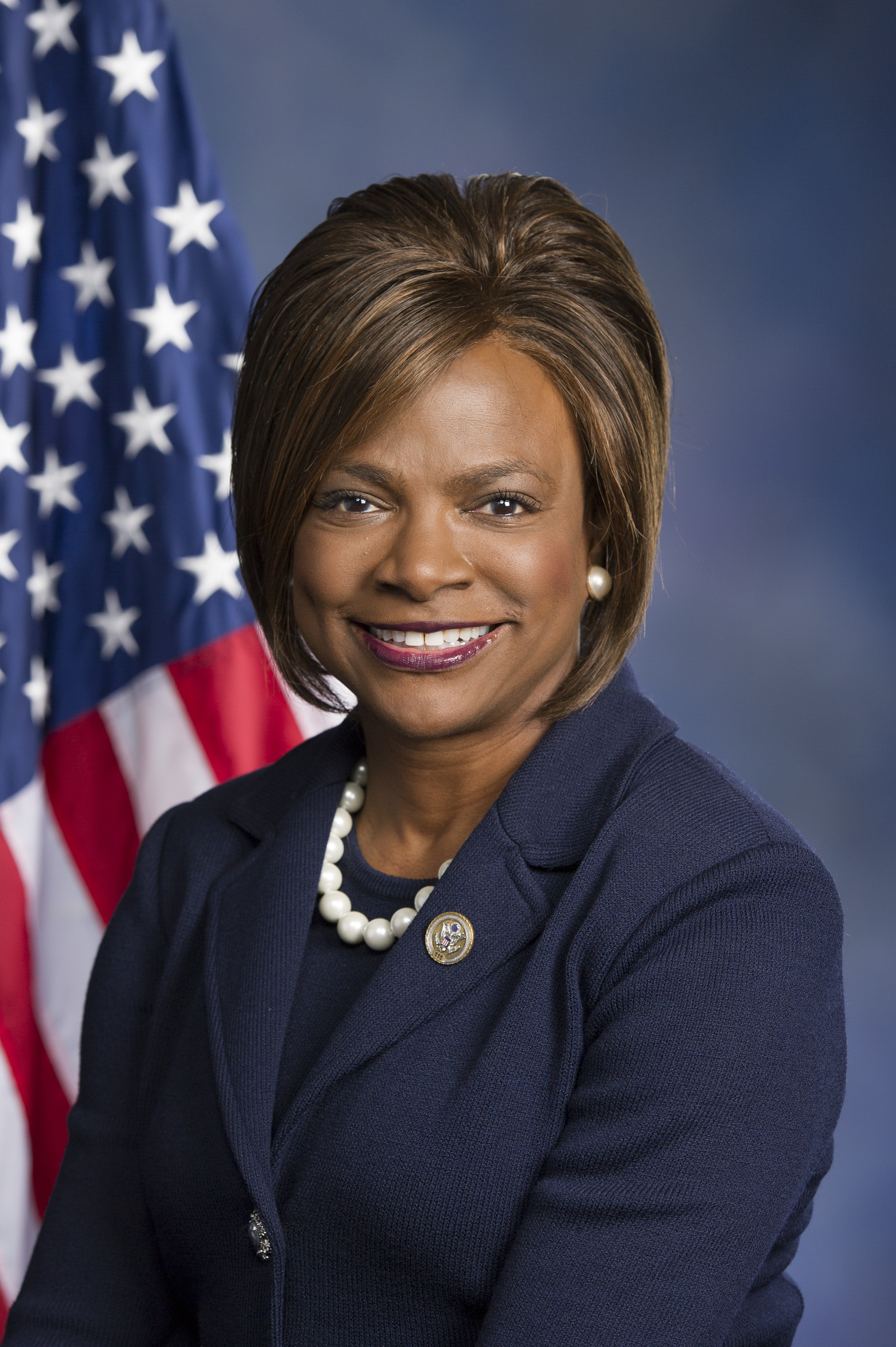
Val Demings

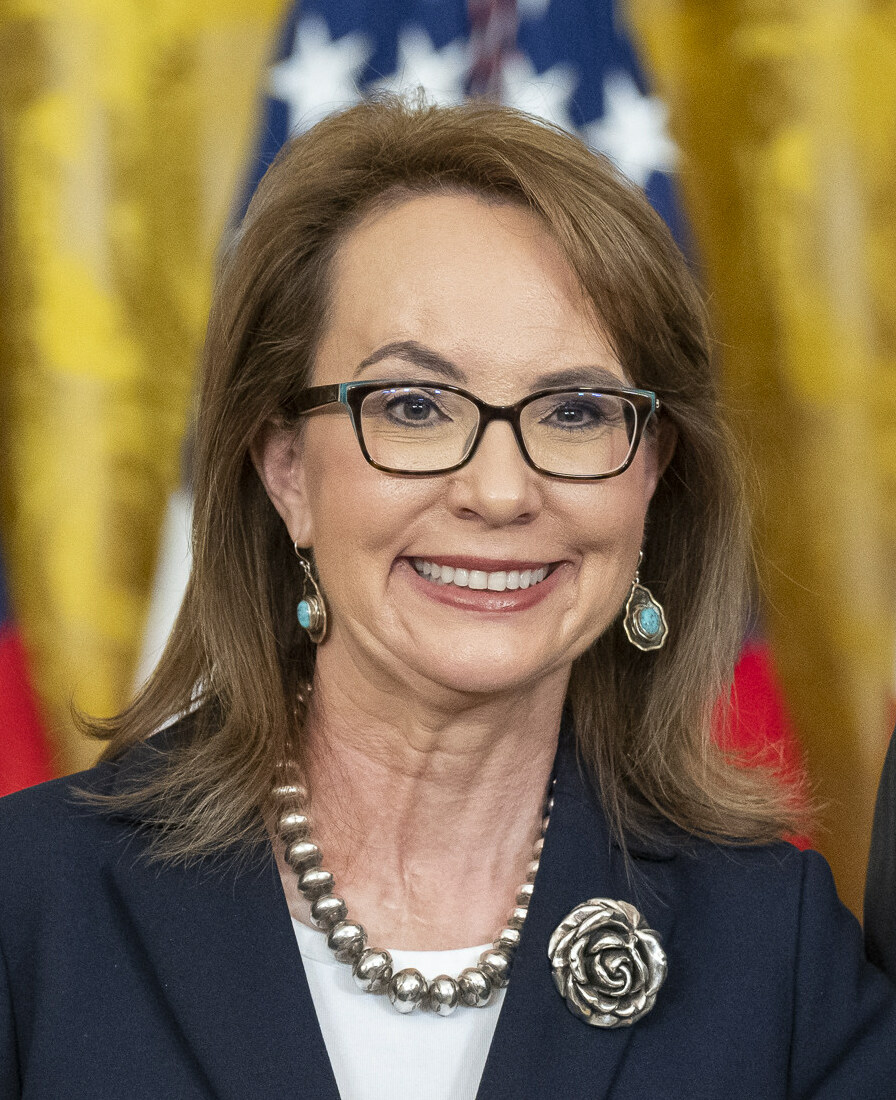
Gabby Giffords

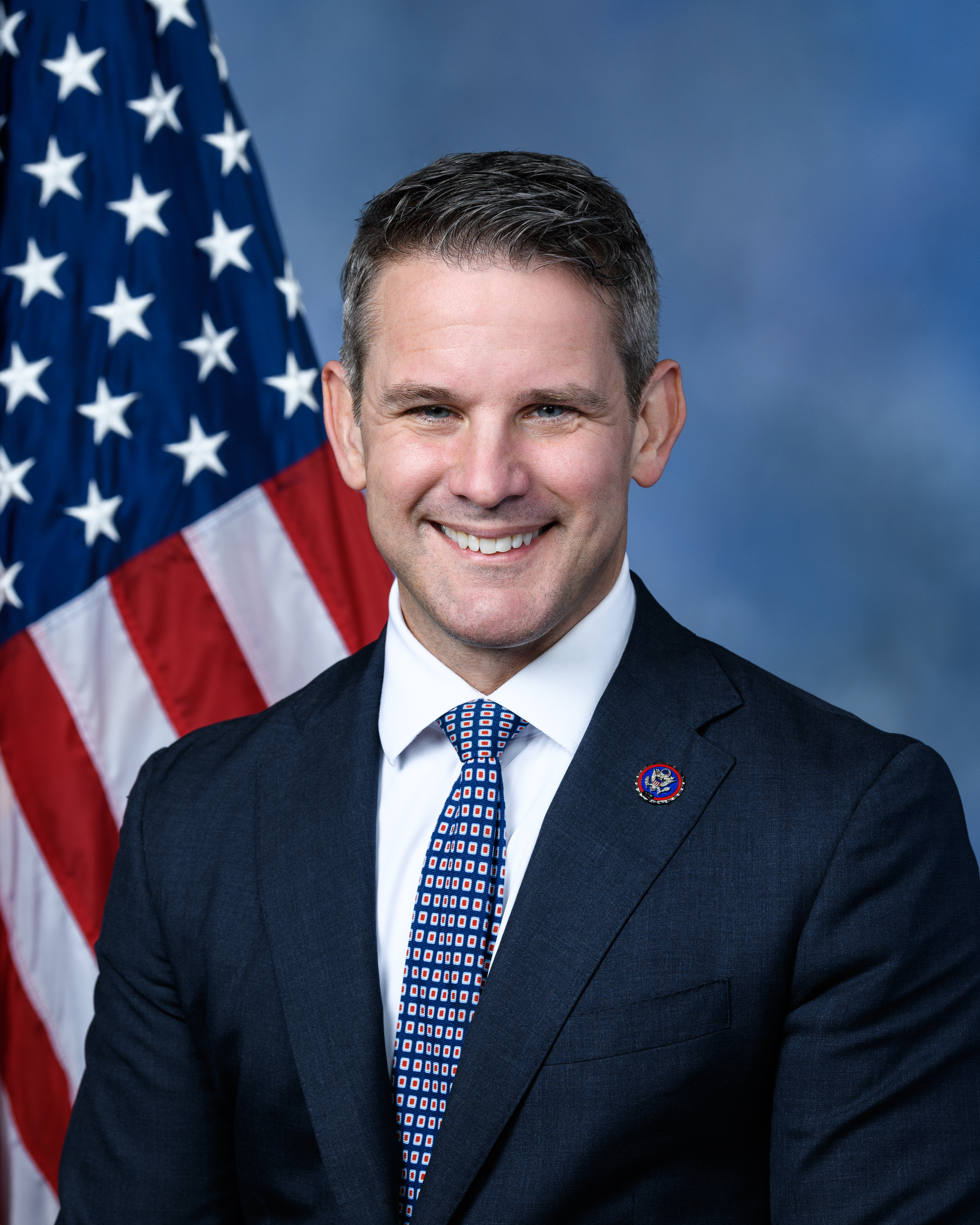
Adam Kinzinger

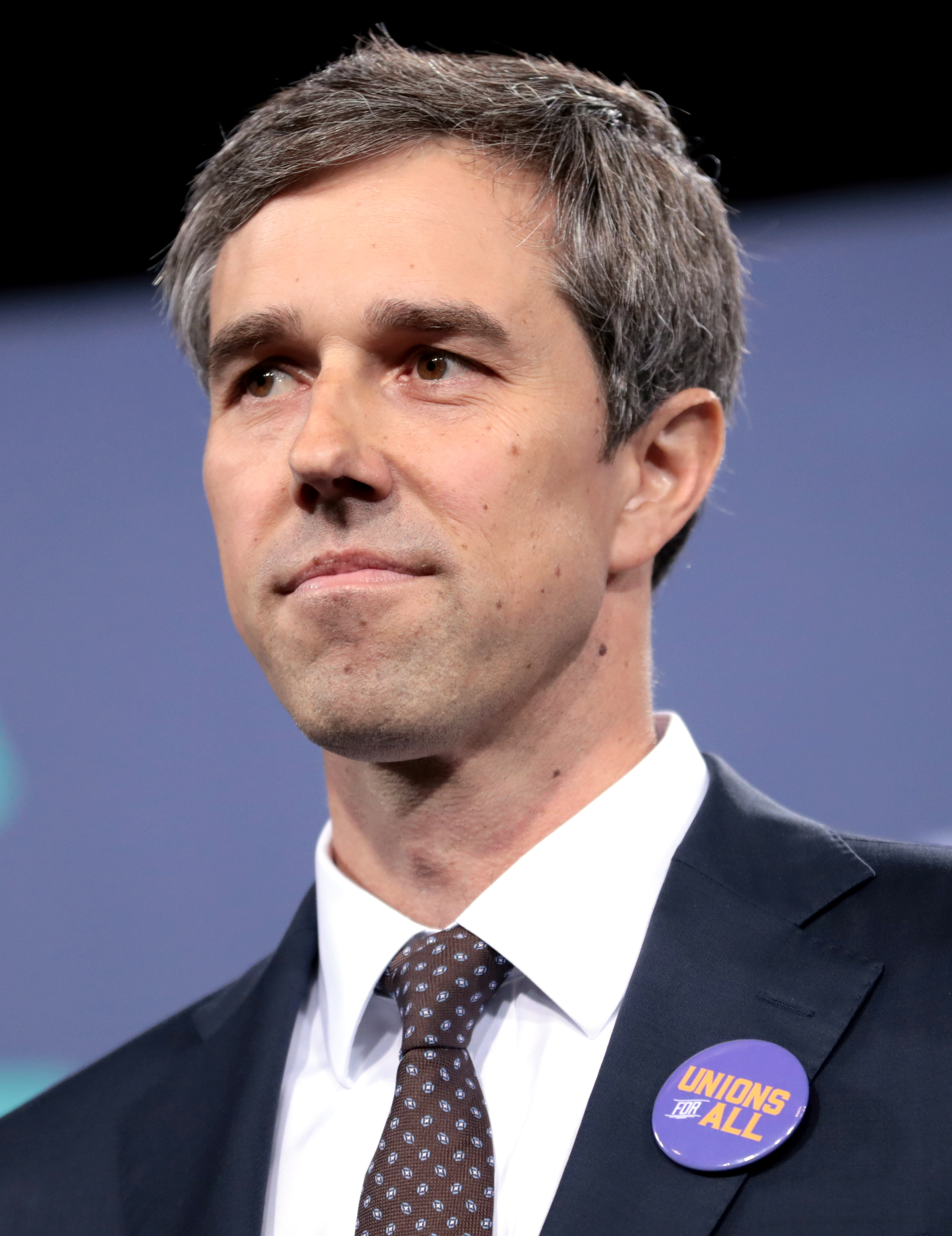
Beto O'Rourke

- Gary Ackerman, NY-5 (1993–2013), NY-7 (1983–1993)
- Les AuCoin, OR-01 (1975–1993)
- Brian Baird, WA-03 (1999–2011)
- Peter Barca, WI-01 (1993–1995), 2024 Democratic nominee for WI-01
- David Bonior, MI-10 (1993–2003), MI-12 (1977–1993), House Majority Whip (1991–1995), House Minority Whip (1995–2002)
- Charles Boustany, LA-3 (2013–2017), LA-7 (2005–2013) (Republican)
- G. K. Butterfield, NC-01 (2004–2022)
- Russ Carnahan, MO-03 (2005–2013), Chair of the Missouri Democratic Party (2023–present)
- Rod Chandler, WA-08 (1983–1993) (Republican)
- Liz Cheney, WY-AL (2017–2023), Chair of the House Republican Conference (2019–2021) (Republican)
- Donna Christensen, VI-AL (1997–2015)
- Tom Coleman, MO-06 (1976–1993) (Republican)
- Barbara Comstock, VA-10 (2015–2019) (Republican)
- Joe Crowley, NY-14 (2013–2019), NY-07 (1999–2013), Chair of the House Democratic Caucus (2017–2019)
- Susan Davis, CA-53 (2003–2021), CA-49 (2001–2003)
- John Delaney, MD-06 (2013–2019), 2020 candidate for the Democratic nomination for president
- Val Demings, FL-10 (2017–2023)
- Charlie Dent, PA-15 (2005–2018) (Republican)
- Joe DioGuardi, NY-20 (1985–1989) (Republican)
- Chuck Douglas, NH-02 (1989–1991) (Republican)
- Mickey Edwards, OK-05 (1977–1993) (Independent)
- David F. Emery, ME-01 (1975–1983), House Republican Chief Deputy Whip (1981–1983) (Republican)
- William Enyart, IL-12 (2013–2015)
- Barney Frank, MA-04 (1981–2013)
- Martin Frost, TX-24 (1979–2005), Chair of the House Democratic Caucus (1999–2003)
- Dick Gephardt, MO-03 (1977–2005), House Minority Leader (1995–2003), House Majority Leader (1989–1995), Chair of the House Democratic Caucus (1985–1989)
- Gabby Giffords, AZ-08 (2007–2012), wife of U.S. senator Mark Kelly
- Wayne Gilchrest, MD-01 (1991–2009)
- Jim Greenwood, PA-08 (1993–2005) (Republican)
- Kwanza Hall, GA-05 (2020–2021)
- Colleen Hanabusa, HI-01 (2011–2015, 2016–2019)
- Jane Harman, CA-36 (1993–1999, 2001–2011)
- Katie Hill, CA-25 (2019)
- Earl Hilliard Sr., AL-07 (1993–2003)
- Paul Hodes, NH-02 (2007–2011)
- Elizabeth Holtzman, NY-16 (1973–1981)
- Bob Inglis, SC-04 (1993–1999, 2005–2011) (Republican)
- Steve Israel, NY-3 (2013–2017), NY-2 (2001–2013)
- David Jolly, FL-13 (2014–2017) (Forward)
- Mondaire Jones, NY-17 (2021–2023), 2024 Democratic nominee for NY-17
- Kai Kahele, HI-02 (2021–2023)
- Paul Kanjorski, PA-11 (1985–2011)
- Patrick J. Kennedy, RI-01 (1995–2011)
- Adam Kinzinger, IL-16 (2013–2023), IL-11 (2011–2013) (Republican)
- Ron Klein, FL-22 (2007–2011)
- Brenda Lawrence, MI-14 (2015–2023)
- John LeBoutillier, NY-06 (1981–1983) (Republican)
- Mel Levine, CA-27 (1983–1993)
- Nita Lowey, NY-17 (2013–2021), NY-18 (1993–2013), NY-20 (1989–1993)
- Tom Malinowski, NJ-07 (2019–2023), Assistant Secretary of State for Democracy, Human Rights, and Labor (2014–2017)
- Marjorie Margolies, PA-13 (1993–1995)
- Ben McAdams, UT-04 (2019–2021)
- Dan Miller, FL-13 (1993–2003) (Republican)
- Harry Mitchell, AZ-05 (2007–2011)
- Toby Moffett, CT-6 (1975–1983)
- Susan Molinari, NY-13 (1993–1997), NY-14 (1991–1993) (Republican)
- Debbie Mucarsel-Powell, FL-26 (2019–2021), 2024 candidate for Senate
- Marie Newman, IL-03 (2021–2023)
- Beto O'Rourke, TX-16 (2013–2019), 2020 candidate for the Democratic nomination for president
- Richard Ottinger, NY-20 (1983–1985), NY-24 (1975–1983), NY-25 (1965–1971)
- Bill Pascrell, NJ-09 (1997–2024) (deceased)
- Bill Paxon, NY-27 (1993–1999), NY-31 (1989–1993) (Republican)
- Jack Quinn, NY-30 (1993–2005) (Republican)
- Denver Riggleman, VA-05 (2019–2021) (Independent)
- Charlie Rodríguez, Puerto Rico shadow member (2017–2021) (New Progressive Party)
- Max Rose, NY-11 (2019–2021)
- Tim Ryan, OH-13 (2013–2023), OH-17 (2003–2013), 2020 candidate for the Democratic nomination for president
- Joe Scarborough, FL-01 (1995–2001), host of Morning Joe (Independent)
- Claudine Schneider, RI-02 (1981–1991) (Republican)
- Allyson Schwartz, PA-13 (2005–2015)
- Joe Schwarz, MI-07 (2005–2007) (Republican)
- Joe Sestak, PA-07 (2007–2011), 2020 candidate for the Democratic nomination for president (Forward, Democratic until 2022)
- Chris Shays, CT-04 (1987–2009) (Republican)
- Lawrence J. Smith, FL-16 (1983–1993)
- Peter Plympton Smith, VT-AL (1989–1991), Lieutenant Governor of Vermont (1983–1987) (Republican)
- Zack Space, OH-18 (2007–2011)
- Jackie Speier, CA-14 (2013–2023), CA-12 (2008–2013)
- Alan Steelman, TX-05 (1973–1977) (Republican)
- Edolphus Towns, NY-10 (1993–2013), NY-11 (1983–1993)
- David Trott, MI-11 (2015–2019) (Republican)
- Niki Tsongas, MA-03 (2013–2019), MA-05 (2007–2013)
- Fred Upton, MI-06 (1993–2023), MI-04 (1987–1993) (Republican)
- Mike Ward, KY-03 (1995–1997)
- Joe Walsh, IL-08 (2011–2013), Republican candidate for president in 2020 (Independent)
- Henry Waxman, CA-33 (2013–2015), CA-30 (2003–2013), CA-29 (1993–2003), CA-24 (1975–1993)
- Robert Wexler, FL-19 (1997–2010)
- John Yarmuth, KY-03 (2007–2023)

== See also ==
- List of Donald Trump 2024 presidential campaign congressional legislators endorsements
- List of Kamala Harris 2024 presidential campaign political endorsements
