= List of Kamala Harris 2024 presidential campaign political endorsements =

List of endorsements for Kamala Harris's 2024 presidential campaign

Following President Joe Biden's 21 July 2024 decision not to seek re-election and to endorse her as the Democratic nominee, Vice-President Kamala Harris rapidly consolidated support from elected officials, party organisations, advocacy groups and civil-society organisations. This page lists those endorsements, grouped by sector and alphabetised within each subsection. For tables of individual office-holders, see the "main" articles linked below.

== Party organisations and officials ==
=== National parties ===
- Democratic Party
- Working Families Party

=== State and territorial parties ===
- Alabama Democratic Party
- Alaska Democratic Party
- American Samoa Democratic Party
- Arizona Democratic Party
- Arkansas Democratic Party
- California Democratic Party
- Colorado Democratic Party
- Connecticut Democratic Party
- Connecticut Working Families Party
- Delaware Democratic Party
- District of Columbia Democratic Party
- Florida Democratic Party
- Georgia Democratic Party
- Guam Democratic Party
- Hawaii Democratic Party
- Idaho Democratic Party
- Illinois Democratic Party
- Indiana Democratic Party
- Iowa Democratic Party
- Kansas Democratic Party
- Kentucky Democratic Party
- Louisiana Democratic Party
- Maine Democratic Party
- Maryland Democratic Party
- Massachusetts Democratic Party
- Michigan Democratic Party
- Minnesota Democratic–Farmer–Labor Party
- Mississippi Democratic Party
- Missouri Democratic Party
- Montana Democratic Party
- Nebraska Democratic Party
- Nevada Democratic Party
- New Hampshire Democratic Party
- New Jersey Democratic Party
- New Mexico Democratic Party
- New York State Democratic Committee
- North Carolina Democratic Party
- North Dakota Democratic–Nonpartisan League Party
- Ohio Democratic Party
- Oklahoma Democratic Party
- Oregon Democratic Party
- Northern Mariana Islands Democratic Party
- Pennsylvania Democratic Party
- Popular Democratic Party
- Democratic Party of Puerto Rico
- Rhode Island Democratic Party
- South Carolina Democratic Party
- South Dakota Democratic Party
- Tennessee Democratic Party
- Texas Democratic Party
- Utah Democratic Party
- Vermont Democratic Party
- Democratic Party of Virginia
- Democratic Party of the Virgin Islands
- Washington State Democratic Party
- West Virginia Democratic Party
- Wisconsin Democratic Party
- Wyoming Democratic Party

=== National Democratic Party organisations ===
- College Democrats of America
- Democratic Attorneys General Association
- Democratic Governors Association
- Democratic Lieutenant Governors Association
- Democrats Abroad
- High School Democrats of America
- National Conference of Democratic Mayors
- National Federation of Democratic Women
- Stonewall Democrats
- Young Democrats of America
  - Los Angeles County Young Democrats
  - Puerto Rico Young Democrats
  - Young Democrats of North Carolina
  - Young Democrats of Utah

=== Democratic National Committee officers ===
==== Current ====
The entire leadership of the Democratic National Committee endorsed Vice-President Harris.

- Michelle Regalado Deatrick – chair, DNC Council on the Environment & Climate Crisis (2019–)
- Jaime Harrison – DNC chair (2021–2025)
- Chris Korge – DNC finance chair (2019–)
- Ken Martin – DNC vice-chair (2017–2025)
- Virginia McGregor – DNC treasurer (2021–)
- Henry R. Muñoz III – DNC vice-chair (2022–2025)
- Jason Rae – DNC secretary (2017–)

==== Former ====
- Donna Brazile – acting DNC chair (2011; 2016–2017)
- Christine Pelosi – former vice-chair, DNC Veterans & Military Families Council

== Other organisations ==
=== Civil-rights organisations ===
- 4B America
- AAPI Victory Fund
- Alice B. Toklas LGBTQ Democratic Club
- Alpha PAC
- Asian American Action Fund
- Black Economic Alliance
- Black Feminist Future Action Fund
- Black Muslim Leadership Council Fund
- Black Voters Matter
- Black Women Organized for Political Action PAC
- CASA in Action
- Center for Black Equity Political Action Fund
- Coalition for Humane Immigrant Rights of Los Angeles Action Fund
- Color of Change PAC
- Dolphin Democrats
- Emgage Action
- Equality Arizona
- Equality California
- Equality Florida Action
- EqualityMaine
- Equality North Carolina
- Equality Utah
- Fair Immigration Reform Movement Action
- Fair Wisconsin
- Faith in Public Life Action
- Feminist Majority PAC
- Freedom From Religion Foundation Action Fund
- Garden State Equality
- Guerrilla Girls
- Harvey Milk LGBTQ Democratic Club
- Human Rights Campaign
- International Association of Black Professional Firefighters
- Jews for Racial and Economic Justice
- Latino Victory
- League of United Latin American Citizens
- Lesbians Who Tech + Allies
- LGBTQ Victory Fund
- LPAC
- Make the Road Action
- Mi Familia Decide
- National Black Farmers Association
- National Center for Transgender Equality Action Fund
- National Immigration Law Center Immigrant Justice Fund
- National Korean American Service & Education Consortium Action Fund
- National LGBT Chamber of Commerce
- National LGBTQ Task Force
- National Organization for Women PAC
- National Partnership for Women & Families Action Fund
- National Women's Law Center Action Fund
- National Women's Political Caucus
- Omega Network For Action
- SAVE Action PAC
- Showing Up for Racial Justice
- Silver State Equality
- Southern Poverty Law Center Action Fund
- Stonewall Democrats Utah
- Stonewall Young Democrats
- UltraViolet Action
- UnidosUS Action Fund
- United We Dream PAC
- Voto Latino

=== Congressional caucuses and associated PACs ===
- ASPIRE PAC
- California Legislative Black Caucus
- Congressional Black Caucus PAC
- Congressional Hispanic Caucus PAC
- Congressional Progressive Caucus PAC
- CHC BOLD PAC
- Democratic Black Caucus of Florida
- Equality PAC
- Indiana Black Legislative Caucus
- New Democrat Coalition
- Ohio Legislative Black Caucus
- Pennsylvania LGBT Equality Caucus
- Virginia Legislative Black Caucus

=== Gun-violence-prevention organizations ===
- Brady PAC
- Everytown for Gun Safety
- Giffords
- March for Our Lives

=== Environmental organisations ===
- 350 Action
- California Environmental Voters
- Center for Biological Diversity
- Chesapeake Climate Action Network
- Clean Water Action
- Climate Hawks Vote
- Earthjustice Action
- Environment America Action Fund
- Environmental Defense Fund Action Votes
- Food & Water Action
- Friends of the Earth Action
- GrayPAC
- Jane Fonda Climate PAC
- League of Conservation Voters
- Natural Resources Defense Council Action Fund
- Population Connection Action Fund
- Protect Our Winters Action Fund
- Sierra Club
- Sunrise Movement

=== Israel–Palestine advocacy organizations ===
- Democratic Majority for Israel
- J Street PAC
- Joint Action Committee for Political Affairs
- Zioness Action Fund

=== Abortion-rights organizations ===
- Elect Democratic Women
- Emily's List
- Planned Parenthood Action Fund
- Reproductive Freedom for All

=== Political organisations ===
- 43 Alumni for America
- All Pueblo Council of Governors
- Alliance for Retired Americans
- Alpha Kappa Alpha Sorority PAC
- America Votes
- American Bridge 21st Century
- Americans for Democratic Action
- Bend the Arc
- BlackPAC
- Catholic Democrats
- Center for New Liberalism
- Center for Popular Democracy Action Fund
- Citizens Union
- Community Change Action
- Council for a Livable World
- Courage California
- Delta for Women in Action
- Democrats for Education Reform
- Emerge America
- Freedom, Inc.
- Fuse Washington
- Future Coalition
- Gen-Z for Change
- Haley Voters for Harris
- Humane Society Legislative Fund
- Indivisible Action
- Jewish Democratic Council of America
- Justice for Janitors
- Kentuckians for the Commonwealth
- Leadership Now Project
- San Francisco League of Pissed Off Voters
- The Lincoln Project
- MoveOn
- National Association of Social Workers PAC
- National Committee to Preserve Social Security and Medicare
- New York Communities for Change
- NewDem Action Fund
- NextGen America PAC
- One Fair Wage Action
- People for the American Way
- People's Action
- PODER PAC
- Population Connection
- Priorities USA Action
- Progressive Change Campaign Committee
- Progressive Leadership Alliance of Nevada Action
- Reclaim Philadelphia
- Republican Accountability Project
- Retired Americans PAC
- Social Democrats, USA
- Social Security Works PAC
- Stand Up America
- Swing Left
- The NewDEAL
- Third Way
- Truman National Security Project
- Vote Common Good
- Voters of Tomorrow
- VoteRunLead Action
- VoteVets.org
- WelcomePAC
- White Dudes for Harris

== See also ==
- List of Donald Trump 2024 presidential campaign political endorsements
- List of Hillary Clinton 2016 presidential campaign political endorsements
- List of Kamala Harris 2024 presidential campaign endorsements
