= History of the Catholic Church in the United States (disambiguation) =

The history of the Catholic Church in the United States may refer to:

- History of the Catholic Church in the United States
  - 20th century history of the Catholic Church in the United States
  - 19th century history of the Catholic Church in the United States
- Catholic Church in the United States#History
- Catholic Church and politics in the United States
- History of Catholic education in the United States
- Catholic sisters and nuns in the United States
- History of religion in the United States#Roman Catholicism
- Anti-Catholicism in the United States
