= Catholic Church and politics in the United States =

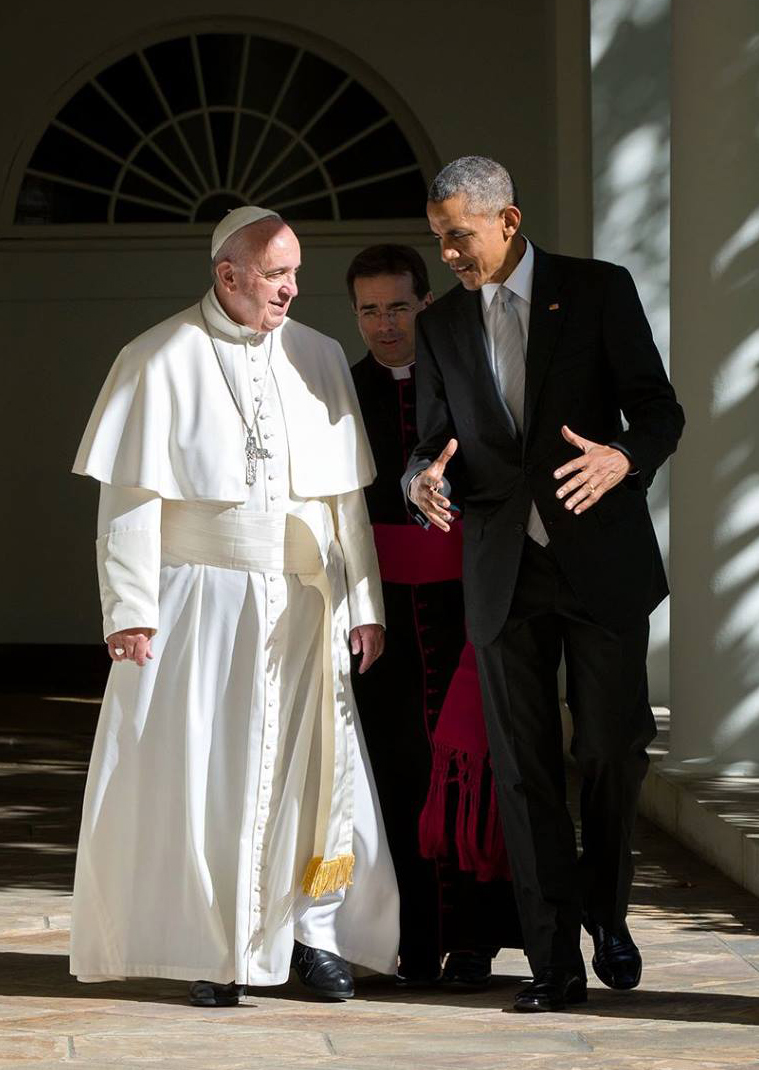
Pope Francis and former President of the United States, Barack Obama in 2015

Members of the Catholic Church have been active in the elections of the United States since the mid-19th century. The United States has never had religious parties (unlike much of the world, especially in Europe and Latin America). There has never been an American Catholic religious party, either local, state or national.

In 1776, Catholics comprised less than 1% of the total population of the new nation, though they were a considerably larger proportion of the population in Maryland, which had been founded a haven for Catholics persecuted in England. Growth was slow until the 1840s, when heavy immigration began from Germany and Ireland. After 1880 Catholics arrived from Italy, Poland and elsewhere in Catholic Europe. Migration from Mexico, Puerto Rico and Central America came in the 20th and 21st centuries. The membership is about 68 million members today. Catholic voters now comprise 25% to 27% of the national electorate. 85% of today's Catholics report their faith to be "somewhat" to "very important" to them. From the mid-19th century down to 1964 Catholics were solidly Democratic, sometimes at the 80–90% level. From the 1930s to the 1950s Catholics formed a core part of the New Deal Coalition, with overlapping memberships in the church, labor unions, big city machines, and the working class, all of which promoted liberal policy positions in domestic affairs and anti-communism during the Cold War.

Since the election of the nation's first Catholic president in 1960, Catholics have split about 50–50 between the two major parties in national elections. Beginning with the decline of unions and big city machines, increased suburbanization and with upward mobility into the middle classes, Catholics have drifted away from liberalism of the Democratic Party and toward conservatism on economic issues (such as taxes). Since the end of the Cold War, their strong anti-Communism has faded in importance. On social issues the Catholic Church takes strong positions against abortion and same-sex marriage and has formed coalitions with Protestant evangelicals.

Religious tensions were major issues in the presidential election of 1928 when the Democrats nominated Al Smith, a Catholic who was defeated, and in 1960 when the Democrats also nominated John F. Kennedy, a Catholic who was elected. For the next three elections, a Catholic was nominated for the vice presidency by one of the two major parties (Bill Miller in 1964, Ed Muskie in 1968, Tom Eagleton and then Sargent Shriver in 1972). Each one lost. Geraldine Ferraro continued the tradition in 1984, but she also lost. A Catholic at the top of the ticket, John Kerry, lost the 2004 election to incumbent George W. Bush, a Methodist, who won majority of the Catholic vote. However, majority of the Hispanic Catholic vote voted for both Gore and Kerry The 2012 election was the first where both major party vice presidential candidates were Catholic, Joe Biden and Paul Ryan.

As of January 2023, there are 27 (out of 100) Catholics in the United States Senate, and 122 (out of 435) Catholics in the United States House of Representatives, including House Majority Leader Steve Scalise. In 2008, Joe Biden became the first Catholic to be elected Vice President of the United States. His successor Mike Pence was raised as a Catholic but converted to evangelical Protestantism. In 2020, Biden was elected the second Catholic president of the United States. Two First Ladies (Jacqueline Kennedy and Melania Trump) have been professed Catholics. Incumbent Vice President JD Vance converted to Catholicism in 2019, making him the second Catholic to hold the post, and has acknowledged the influence of Catholic theology on his sociopolitical positions, such as his staunch opposition to childlessness, abortion, and same-sex marriage.

== 19th century ==
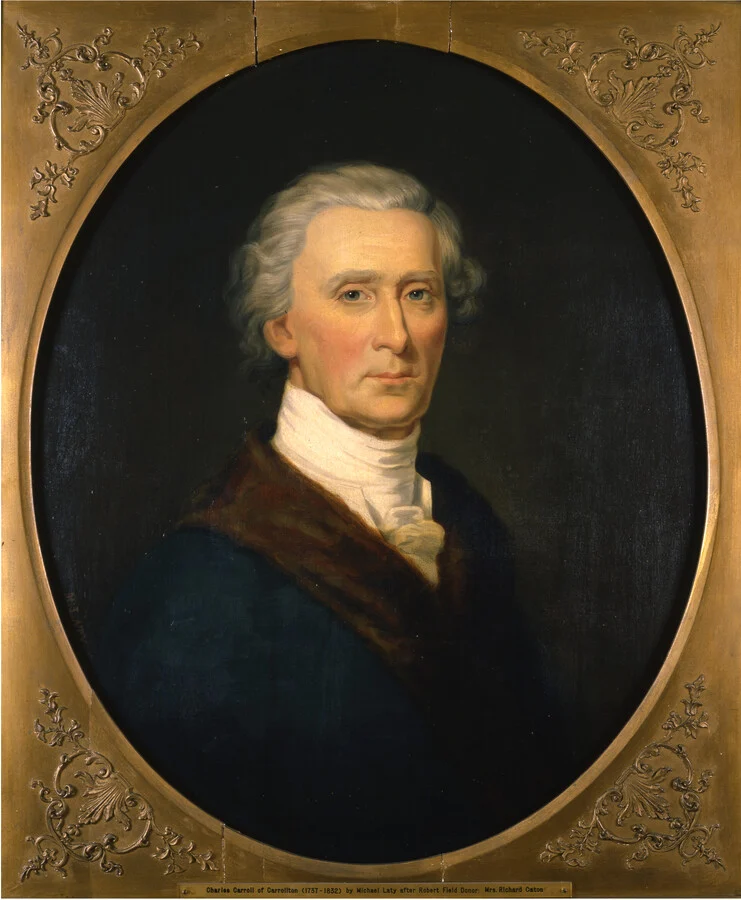
Charles Carroll

Before 1840, Catholics constituted a small minority and as a result, they played a relatively minor role in early American history. Catholics only constituted a significant community in Maryland and Baltimore became an early center of Catholicism. From the American Revolution until the end of the 18th century, about 1% of the American population (about 30,000) was Catholic. Still, Catholics were among the Founding Fathers and they were also a part of the First Congress; Daniel Carroll serving Maryland's 6th congressional district, and Charles Carroll of Carrollton serving as the first senator from Maryland. Presidential candidates did not seek Catholic votes until Andrew Jackson and Henry Clay did so in 1832.

=== Catholics and urban America ===
The role of Catholics in American culture and elections dramatically changed as a result of the mass immigration of Catholics from Europe, especially those of Irish and German descent. By 1840, there were about 600,000 Catholics in the United States. In the 1840s, 200,000 Irish immigrated to escape poverty. The Great Famine of Ireland which lasted from 1845 to 1852 caused the Irish population in America to number 962,000, the number doubled in the next ten years. Even larger numbers of immigrants came from traditionally Catholic regions of Germany and traditionally Catholic regions of other parts of Europe. Because most of these new arrivals lived in ethnic communities, they typically joined the local Catholic church that was in communion with Rome through the local diocese; how many of them cut their ties with the Catholic Church is a matter of speculation. The Irish Catholics took controlling positions in the Catholic Church, labor unions, and Democratic organizations in the big cities, thus forming overlapping centers of strength. The sudden new arrival of so many Catholics, charges of political corruption, and fears of papal interference caused anti-Catholicism to grow, including the short-lived Know Nothings party in the 1850s which demanded a purification of elections and statutes from Catholic influence.

Many Catholics served in the Civil War armies, they served in both the North and the South, and the bishops rejected the antiwar and anti-draft sentiments of some Catholics. The rapid rise of the Irish out of poverty, and the continuing growth in membership, especially in industrial and urban areas, made the church the largest denomination in the U.S. Distrusting public schools which were dominated by Protestants, Catholics built their own network of parochial elementary schools (and, later, they built high schools), as well as colleges, and public funding of parochial schools was a controversial issue. As the Bennett Law episode in 1890 in Wisconsin demonstrated, Catholics were willing to cooperate politically with German Lutherans to protect their parochial schools. A distinct Catholic vote existed, however; in the late 19th century, 75% of Irish and German Catholics in America voted for Democratic presidential candidates. The Irish increasingly controlled the Democratic party machinery in major cities.

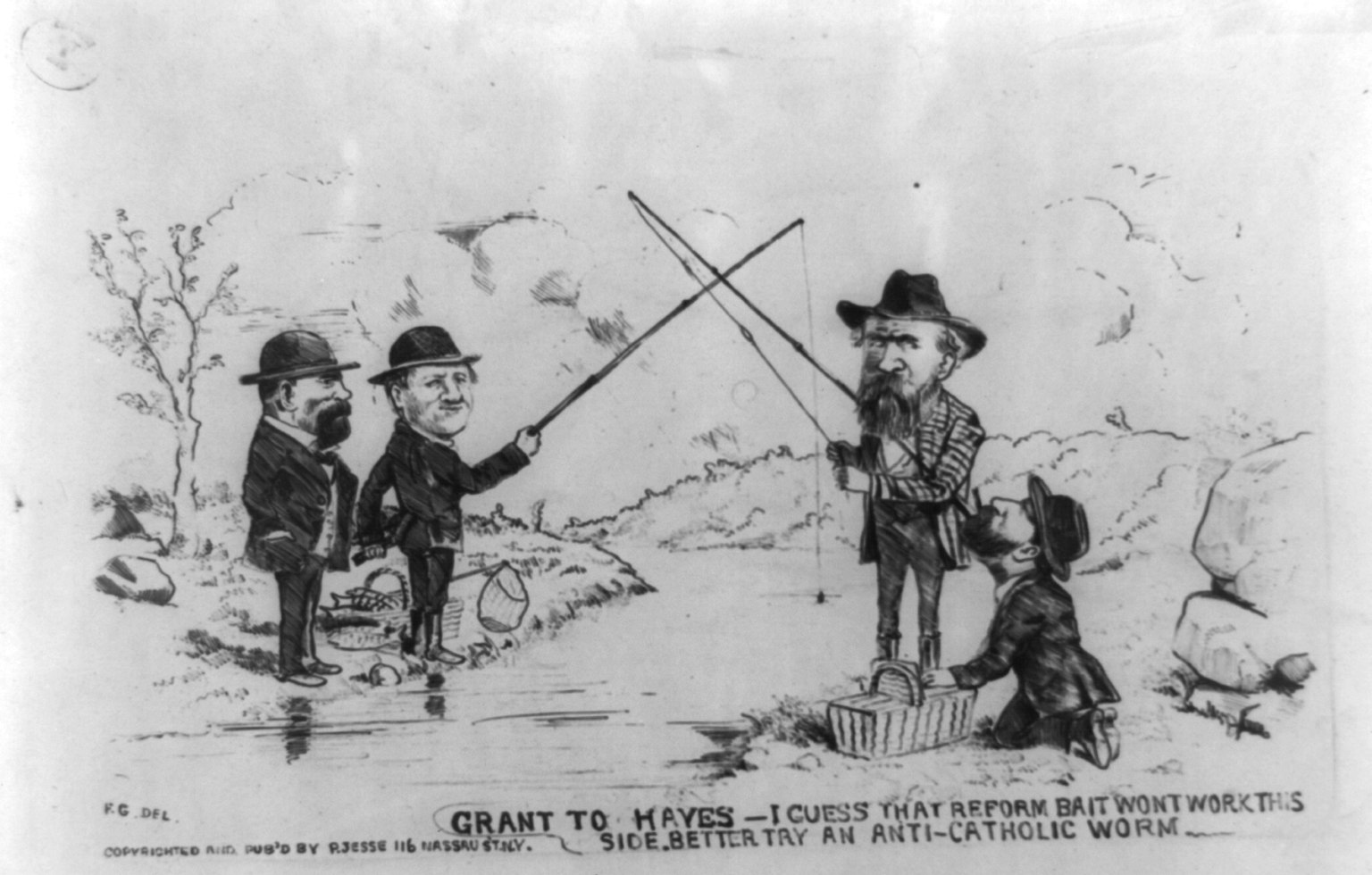
Political cartoon about the use of anti-Catholic sentiment in Hayes' presidential election

Religious lines were sharply drawn in the North in the Third Party System that lasted from the 1850s to the 1890s. In the South, the Catholics voted the same as Protestants, with race as the main dividing line. Methodists, Congregationalists, Presbyterians, Scandinavian Lutherans and other Protestant pietists in the North were tightly linked to the GOP. In sharp contrast, liturgical groups, especially the Catholics, Episcopalians, and German Lutherans, looked to the Democratic Party for protection from pietistic moralism, especially prohibition. While both parties cut across economic class structures, the Democrats were supported more heavily by its lower tiers.

Cultural issues, especially prohibition and foreign language schools, became important because of the sharp religious divisions in the electorate. In the North, about 50% of the voters were pietistic Protestants who believed that the government should be used to reduce the pervasiveness of social sins, such as drinking. Liturgical churches comprised over a quarter of the vote and they wanted the government to stay out of personal morality issues. Prohibition debates and referendums heated up elections in most states over a period of decades, as national prohibition was finally passed in 1918 (and it was repealed in 1932), serving as a major issue between the wet Democrats and the dry GOP.

Voting Behavior by Religion, Northern USA Late 19th century
| Religion | % Dem | % GOP |
Immigrants
| Irish Catholics | 80 | 20 |
| All Catholics | 70 | 30 |
| Confessional German Lutherans | 65 | 35 |
| German Reformed | 60 | 40 |
| French Canadian Catholics | 50 | 50 |
| Less Confessional German Lutherans | 45 | 55 |
| English Canadians | 40 | 60 |
| British Stock | 35 | 65 |
| German Sectarians | 30 | 70 |
| Norwegian Lutherans | 20 | 80 |
| Swedish Lutherans | 15 | 85 |
| Haugean Norwegians | 5 | 95 |
Natives
Northern Stock
| Quakers | 5 | 95 |
| Free Will Baptists | 20 | 80 |
| Congregational | 25 | 75 |
| Methodists | 25 | 75 |
| Regular Baptists | 35 | 65 |
| Blacks | 40 | 60 |
| Presbyterians | 40 | 60 |
| Episcopalians | 45 | 55 |
Southern Stock
| Disciples | 50 | 50 |
| Presbyterians | 70 | 30 |
| Baptists | 75 | 25 |
| Methodists | 90 | 10 |

Source: Paul Kleppner, The Third Electoral System 1853-1892 (1979) p. 182

=== Labor union movement ===
The Catholic Church exercised a prominent role in shaping America's labor movement. From the onset of significant immigration in the 1840s, the church in the United States was predominantly urban, with both its leaders and congregants usually of the laboring classes. Over the course of the second half of the nineteenth century, nativism, anti-Catholicism, and anti-unionism coalesced in Republican elections, and Catholics gravitated toward unions and the Democratic Party.

The Knights of Labor was the earliest labor organization in the United States, and in the 1880s, this was the largest labor union in the United States. It is estimated that at least half its membership was Catholic (including Terence Powderly, its president from 1881 onward).

In Rerum novarum (1891), Pope Leo XIII criticized the concentration of wealth and power, spoke out against the abuses that workers faced and demanded that workers should be granted certain rights and safety regulations. He upheld the right of voluntary association, specifically commending labor unions. At the same time, he reiterated the church's defense of private property, condemned socialism, and emphasized the need for Catholics to form and join unions that were not compromised by secular and revolutionary ideologies.

Rerum novarum provided new impetus for Church leaders to establish a variety of social services for the working class element that predominated the lay membership. That included the Social Action Department of the National Catholic Welfare Council, and support for priests involved in labor issues at local factories.

Rerum novarum also provided new impetus for Catholics to become more active in the labor movement. Its exhortation to form specifically Catholic labor unions was widely interpreted as irrelevant to the pluralist context of the United States. While atheism underpinned many European unions and stimulated Catholic unionists to form separate labor federations, the religious neutrality of unions in the U.S. provided no such impetus. Irish Catholics often dominated unions, and they exerted influence across organized labor. Catholic union members and leaders played important roles in steering American unions away from socialism.

== 20th century ==
By 1900, Catholics represented 14 percent of the total U.S. population and soon became the single largest religious denomination in the country. Still, Catholics did not hold many high offices in government. Only one of the first 54 justices on the United States Supreme Court was Catholic, Roger B. Taney, appointed in 1836. From the 1930s to the 1950s, Catholics formed a core part of the New Deal Coalition, with overlapping memberships in the church, labor unions, big city machines, and the working class, all of which promoted liberal policy positions in domestic affairs and anti-communism during the Cold War. This New Deal Coalition formed under Franklin Roosevelt was led by his Postmaster General and the nation's first Irish American Roman Catholic Cabinet member James Farley.

=== Bishops' Program of Social Reconstruction ===
Following World War I, many hoped that a new commitment to social reform would characterize the ensuing peace. The council saw an opportunity to use its national voice to shape reform and in April 1918 created a Committee for Reconstruction. John A. Ryan wrote the Bishops' Program of Social Reconstruction. Combining Progressive thought and Catholic theology, Ryan believed that government intervention was the most effective means of affecting positive change for his church as well as working people and the poor. On February 12, 1919, the National Catholic War Council issued the "Bishops' Program of Social Reconstruction".

The program received a mixed reception both within the church and outside it. The National Catholic War Council was a voluntary organization with no canonical status. Its ability to speak authoritatively was therefore questioned. Many bishops threw their support behind the Program, but some, including Bishop William Turner of Buffalo and William Henry O'Connell of Boston, opposed it. O'Connell believed some aspects of the plan smacked too much of socialism. Response outside the church was also divided: labor organizations backed it, for example, and business groups criticized it.

=== Defense of parochial school system ===
After World War I, some states concerned about the influence of immigrants and "foreign" values looked to public schools for help. The states drafted laws designed to use schools to promote a common American culture.

In 1921, the Ku Klux Klan arrived in Oregon and quickly attracted as many as 14,000 members, establishing 58 klaverns by the end of 1922. Given the small population of non-white minorities outside Portland, the Oregon Klan directed its attention almost exclusively against Catholics, who numbered about 8% of the population.

In 1922, the Masonic Grand Lodge of Oregon sponsored a bill to require all school-age children to attend public schools. With support of the Klan and Democratic Governor Walter M. Pierce, endorsed by the Klan, the Compulsory Education Act was passed by a vote of 115,506 to 103,685. Its primary purpose was to shut down Catholic schools in Oregon, but it also affected other private and military schools. The constitutionality of the law was challenged in court and ultimately struck down by the US Supreme Court in Pierce v. Society of Sisters (1925) before it went into effect, in a ruling that has been called "the Magna Carta of the parochial school system." The law caused outraged Catholics to organize locally and nationally for the right to send their children to Catholic schools.

Pope Pius XI, in 1929, explicitly referenced this Supreme Court case in his encyclical Divini illius Magistri on Catholic education. He quoted in a footnote the part of the case:

The fundamental theory of liberty upon which all governments in this Union repose excludes any general power of the State to standardize its children by forcing them to accept instruction from public teachers only. The child is not the mere creature of the State; those who nurture him and direct his destiny have the right coupled with the high duty, to recognize, and prepare him for additional duties.

=== Catholic Worker Movement ===
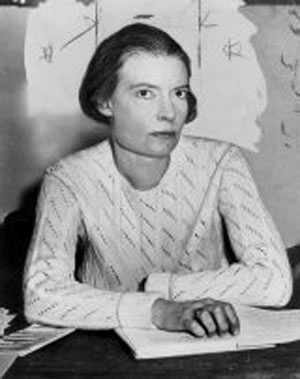
Dorothy Day

The Catholic Worker movement began as a means to combine Dorothy Day's history in American social activism, anarchism, and pacifism with the tenets of Catholicism (including a strong current of distributism), five years after her 1927 conversion.

The group started with the Catholic Worker newspaper, created to promote Catholic social teaching and stake out a neutral, pacifist position in the wartorn 1930s. It grew into a "house of hospitality" in the slums of New York City and then a series of farms for people to live together communally. The movement quickly spread to other cities in the United States and to Canada and the United Kingdom; more than 30 independent but affiliated CW communities had been founded by 1941. Well over 100 communities exist today, including several in Australia, the United Kingdom, Canada, Germany, The Netherlands, the Republic of Ireland, Mexico, New Zealand, and Sweden.

Similar houses of hospitality were established by Russian immigrant and Catholic social worker, Catherine Doherty, founder of Madonna House.

=== 1930s ===
Historian John McGreevey notes, "Priests across the country in the 1930s encouraged their parishioners to join unions, and some like Pittsburgh's Charles Rice, Detroit's Frederick Siedenberg, and Buffalo's John P. Boland, served on regional labor boards and played key roles in workplace negotiations." The Catholic Worker Movement and Dorothy Day grew out of the same impetuses to put Catholic social teaching into action.

The Catholic Church encouraged Catholic workers to join the unions such as the Congress of Industrial Organizations "to improve their economic status and to act as a moderating force in the new labor movement". Catholic clergy promoted and founded moderate trade unions, such as the Association of Catholic Trade Unionists and the Archdiocesan Labor Institute in 1939. American Catholics of that era were generally New Deal liberals who actively supported the CIO, viewed government as a positive force for social reform and often participated in non-communist trade unions, becoming a prominent group of the United Auto Workers. According to Colleen Doody, Catholics were the "backbone and the bane of New Deal liberalism".

=== Catholic Conference on Industrial Problems ===
The Catholic Conference on Industrial Problems (1923–1937) was conceived by Raymond McGowan as a way of bringing together Catholic leaders in the fields of theology, labor, and business, with a view to promoting awareness and discussion of Catholic social teaching. Its first meeting was held in Milwaukee. While it was the venue for important discussions during its existence, its demise was due partly to lack of participation by business executives who perceived the dominant tone of the group as anti-business.

== 21st century ==
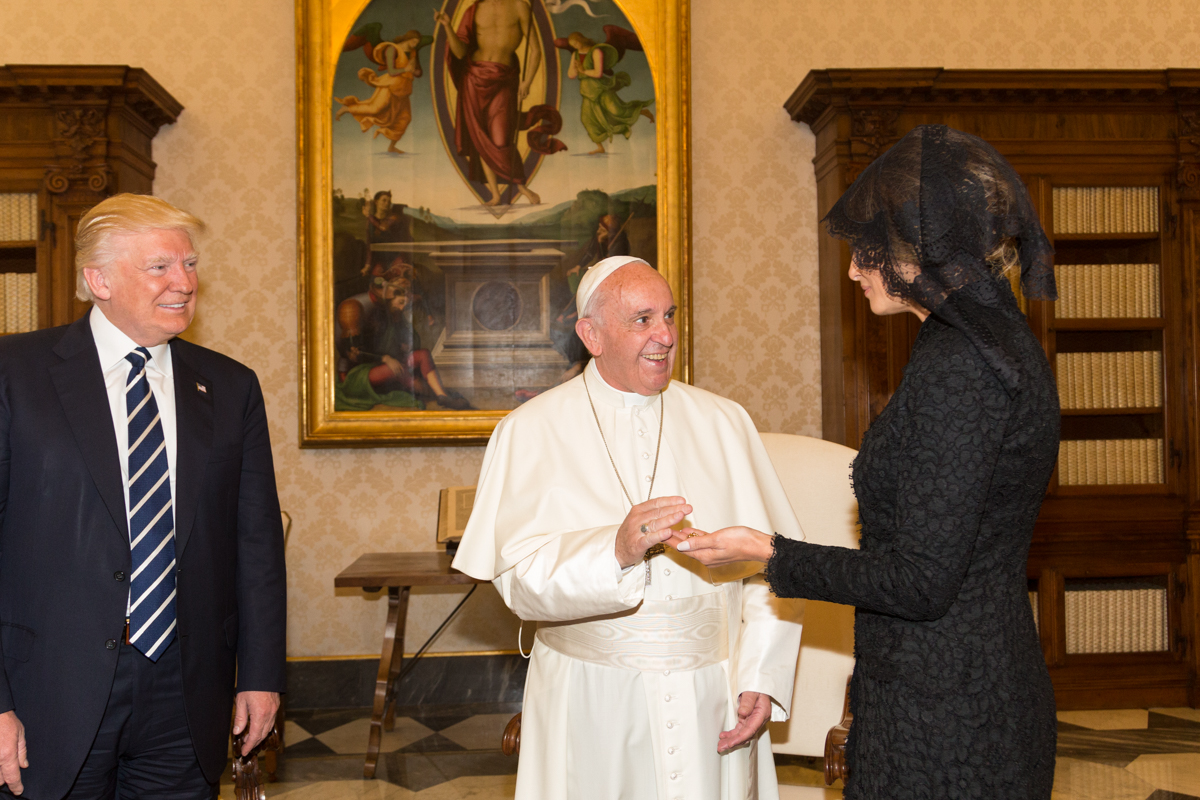
U.S. President Donald Trump and First Lady Melania Trump meeting with Pope Francis, Wednesday, May 24, 2017, in Vatican City

Religion plays a part in American elections. Religion is part of the political debate over LGBTQ rights, abortion, the right to die/assisted suicide, universal health care, workers rights and immigration.

According to Dr. John Green of University of Akron, "There isn't a Catholic vote anymore; there are several Catholic votes." A survey conducted by the Gallup organization in 2009 revealed that, despite the opposition of the church to abortion and embryonic stem-cell research, there is no significant difference between the opinions of Catholics and non-Catholics on these questions.

=== Voting guides ===
In 1991, under Pope John Paul II, the USCCB released the “Putting Children and Families First: A Challenge for Our Church, Nation and World” article outlining legislation on how a Catholic should vote.

In 2004, Catholic Answers, a private lay Catholic apostolate, published its Voter's Guide for Serious Catholics. It also published Voter's Guide for Serious Christians for non-Catholics. In 2006, it revamped the guides and published them on its Catholic Answers Action web site.

In 2016 another Catholic organization, Catholics in Alliance for the Common Good, published the Pope Francis Voter Guide to help inform the faithful about their specifically political vocation as Catholics in the United States.

In January 2016, the United States Conference of Catholic Bishops produced an updated version of their 2007 voter's guide, Forming Consciences for Faithful Citizenship. It is a summary of the USCCB's public policies based on church teachings.

In September 2016, Bishop Thomas J. Olmsted of the Diocese of Phoenix issued the fourth edition of his guide, Catholics in the Public Square. In it, he suggests to politicians supporting abortion that they would need to repent and go to Confession before receiving Holy Communion, in contrast with other bishops such as Cardinals Timothy Dolan and Donald Wuerl, who say that the church does not deny communion over issues of legislation.

=== Marriage and family ===
The Roman Catholic Church defines marriage as a covenant "by which a man and a woman establish between themselves a partnership of the whole of life and which is ordered by its nature to the good of the spouses and the procreation and education of offspring." The church teaches that "homosexual acts are intrinsically disordered. They are contrary to the natural law. They close the sexual act to the gift of life. They do not proceed from a genuine affective and sexual complementarity. Under no circumstances can they be approved." Nevertheless, homosexuals "must be accepted with respect, compassion, and sensitivity. Every sign of unjust discrimination in their regard should be avoided." Some Roman Catholics take this to mean that voting in favor of "benefits for lifelong partners" is a compassionate act, whereas others see voting in favor of "benefits for lifelong partners" as merely promoting behavior contrary to natural law. According to a 2009 survey, 59% of practicing Catholics oppose same-sex marriage, while those who are not practicing support it by 51%. Cardinal John Joseph O'Connor was an outspoken critic of homosexuality; other prominent Catholics who were outspoken critics have included John Boehner, David Vitter, Paul Ryan, Newt Gingrich, Rick Santorum, Bobby Jindal, Jeb Bush, Bob McDonnell, Marco Rubio, Michael Steele, Donald Carcieri and Sam Brownback. Catholics Rudolph Giuliani, Chris Christie, Tim Kaine, James Martin, Cardinal Joseph W. Tobin, Archbishop Vincenzo Paglia, Cardinal Blase Cupich, Patrick J. Conroy (Jesuit chaplain to the U. S. House of Representatives), and Bob Casey Jr. have supported gay rights and civil unions but not same-sex marriage. Liberal Catholics have generally supported repeal of sodomy laws that called for jail time for homosexuals and Employment Non-Discrimination laws that would prohibit large employers from firing workers because of sexual orientation. Conservative Catholics have taken the contrary view, rejecting claims that these are examples of "unjust discrimination" and that because homosexual act is an intrinsic evil, it must always be opposed. Recent research by Bouke Klein Teeselink and Georgios Melios has shown that Catholics who leave the Church tend to adopt more progressive views on issues like same-sex marriage and gay rights.

=== Abortion ===
In accordance with its teachings, the Catholic Church opposes abortion in all circumstances and often leads the national debate on abortion. The Roman Catholic Church has been a fierce opponent of liberalized abortion laws and has organized political resistance to such legislation in several Western countries.

Before the Roe v. Wade decision making abortion legal in the United States, the anti-abortion movement in the United States consisted of elite lawyers, politicians, and doctors, almost all of whom were Catholic. The only coordinated opposition to abortion during the early 1970s came from the United States Conference of Catholic Bishops and the Family Life Bureau, also a Catholic organization. Mobilization of a wide-scale anti-abortion movement among Catholics began quickly after the Roe v. Wade decision with the creation of the National Right to Life Committee (NRLC). The NRLC also organized non-Catholics, eventually becoming the largest anti-abortion organization in the United States. The anti-abortion wing of the Democratic Party was also led by Catholic Robert P. Casey, Sr. other anti-abortion Democrats including, Sargent Shriver, Raymond Flynn and Bob Casey Jr.

Reception of communion by Catholic politicians who support abortion rights is controversial in the United States. Such cases typically involve a bishop who prepares to withhold communion from a Catholic politician, though in some cases excommunication has been suggested, and in others, a bishop has instructed a politician to refrain from receiving communion. The first such case was that of Lucy Killea, though such incidents have subsequently occurred during national elections.

In 2004, Cardinal Joseph Ratzinger, then-prefect of the Congregation for the Doctrine of the Faith (who would later become Pope Benedict XVI), instructed American bishops in a confidential memorandum that communion must be denied to Catholic politicians who support legal abortion. However, Cardinals O'Malley, Egan, McCarrick, Wuerl, Mahony and George have said they would not deny communion to a person in public life who supports abortion rights. Cardinal Burke and Charles Chaput, Archbishop of Philadelphia, have shown support for Ratzinger's position, but as of June 2022, neither has followed through on this.

During the 2004 presidential campaign, four bishops planned to deny communion to Catholic politicians who had voted for John Kerry. This provoked a negative reaction, and the Catholic Church took a different approach for the 2008 election. The new message was compiled into a brochure titled "Forming Consciences for Faithful Citizenship," which "emphasized that issues involving 'intrinsically evil' actions could not be equated morally with others," according to the Times. The brochure cites abortion as the "prime example," and it also mentions euthanasia, torture, genocide, unjust war and racism.

In the 2008 U.S. presidential campaign, as many as 89 Catholic bishops proclaimed that Catholics should make abortion their defining issue in the election.

In November 2009, Rhode Island Rep. Patrick Kennedy disclosed that Thomas Tobin had ordered priests in the diocese to deny him communion because of Kennedy's position in favor of unrestricted abortion.

Michael Humphrey of the National Catholic Reporter viewed the 54-45% majority of Catholic voters choosing Obama in the 2008 presidential election as a repudiation of bishops who had warned that voting for Obama would constitute grave matter. The University of Notre Dame, a Catholic institution, named President Barack Obama commencement speaker at its 2009 graduation and bestowed an honorary doctorate degree on him. The invitation drew criticism from Catholics and some members of the church hierarchy because of Obama's policies in favor of promoting and funding abortion.

Polling results show that a majority of Catholics classify themselves as anti-abortion; a 2009 poll showed a 52% majority identifying as anti-abortion. Pew Research, combining polls from 2011 and 2013, notes that over half (53%) of white Catholics believe abortion should be legal in all or most cases, with 41% saying it should be illegal in all or most cases. Among Hispanic Catholics, 43% say it should be legal in all or most cases, while 52% say it should be illegal in all or most cases. Research has found that Catholics who disaffiliate from the Church tend to shift towards more progressive stances on social issues, including increased support for abortion rights.

Notably, President Joseph R. Biden, the second Catholic president of the United States, was vocally pro-choice during his presidency. Biden himself changed his views on abortion over time, originally stating that Roe v. Wade "went too far" after the Supreme Court's decision. Over time, however, Biden became an outspoken advocate for the pro-choice position, lambasting the Supreme Court when it overturned Roe v. Wade in Dobbs v. Jackson Women's Health Organization.

=== Birth control ===
In 1948, Archbishop Richard Cushing campaigned against a Massachusetts referendum to loosen the state's ban on birth control. While the referendum failed, "deployment of the Church's political muscle," according to historian Leslie Tentler, offended non-Catholics and led Cushing to relax his position when the issue was debated again in the 1960s.

The Catholic church hierarchy forbids birth control such as condoms or the pill because it views them as separating sexual intercourse from its intended consequence of reproduction.

In 2012, when the Obama administration proposed regulations that required employer-provided health insurance plans to cover contraception, Catholic companies such as affiliated universities and EWTN Broadcasting, which believed they should be exempt from the law, sued the government, while Catholic religious leaders campaigned against it in church. The regulation was later altered so that an employee of a religious institution which did not wish to provide coverage for reproductive health care could seek it directly from the insurer at no additional cost. Catholic religious authorities continued to oppose the plan, while the Catholic Health Association supported it.

While the pope and the bishops have opposed birth control, the majority of American Catholics disagree with them, and believe the church should change its teaching on birth control. A Pew Research poll conducted in 2013 found that three-quarters of U.S. Catholics (76%) say the church should permit birth control. Catholics who attend services on a weekly basis are more likely to support church teaching on social issues.

=== Immigration ===
The immigration debate has opened a chasm with Republican hardliners who want restrictions. Some 30% of the Roman Catholic population is Hispanic and that percentage continues to rise steadily. Pope John Paul II advocated that countries should accommodate people fleeing from economic hardship. Cardinal Raymond Burke has been involved in rallies to allow undocumented workers a chance at citizenship. By welcoming migrant workers, many of whom are Catholic, Burke says, "we obey the command of Our Lord, who tells us that when we welcome the stranger, we welcome Christ Himself."

In addressing the Pew Research Center's Forum on Religion & Public Life in 2009, Archbishop Charles J. Chaput of Denver discussed the need when talking about reforming immigration law, to do so "... in a comprehensive way, so that justice is done and our borders are protected. It's always both/and; it's not either/or from my perspective." "[N]o one can claim to be Catholic and think it's okay to treat immigrants unjustly or inhumanly. But you can disagree on immigration policies because you think that one works and one doesn't."

Most immigration to the U.S. is from predominantly Roman Catholic nations and about 3/4 of all lapsed Catholics have been replaced by immigrant Catholics in the United States.

In 2006, Cardinal Roger Mahony announced that he would order the clergy and laity of the Archdiocese of Los Angeles to ignore H.R. 4437 if it were to become law. Cardinal Mahony personally lobbied senators Barbara Boxer and Dianne Feinstein to have the Senate consider a comprehensive immigration reform bill, rather than the enforcement-only bill that passed the House of Representatives. Cardinal Mahony also blamed the Congress for the illegal immigration crisis due to their failure to act on the issue in the previous 20 years, opposed H.R. 4437 as punitive and open to abusive interpretation, and supported the Comprehensive Immigration Reform Act of 2006 (S. 2611).

=== Climate change ===
In 2015 Pope Francis declared that man-made climate change is caused by burning fossil fuels. The Pope stated the warming of the planet is rooted in "a throwaway culture" and the developed world's indifference to the destruction of the planet as it pursues short-term economic gains. However, one survey found that the Pope's statement did not significantly affect the views of Catholics on the issue, while Catholic commentaries ranged from praise to dismissal, with some stating that it was not binding or magisterial due to its scientific nature. The Pope's statements on these issues were most prominently laid out in encyclical Laudato si'. The publication by Francis put pressure on Catholics seeking the Republican Party nomination for President in 2016, including Jeb Bush and Rick Santorum, who "have questioned or denied the established science of human-caused climate change, and have harshly criticized policies designed to tax or regulate the burning of fossil fuels."

=== Transgender rights ===
The United States Conference of Catholic Bishops have openly opposed the Equality Act which serves to address discrimination towards members of the LGBTQ+ community. They argued the Equality Act would threaten the religious freedom of Catholics, allow men into women's spaces, and jeopardize existing prohibitions to the federal funding of abortion. They claim that the legislation discourages differing opinions on marriage and sexuality as well as codifying "the new ideology of “gender” in federal law, dismissing sexual difference and falsely presenting “gender” as only a social construct."

== Party affiliation ==
Before the 1960s, when cultural changes led to an incremental liberalization of the Democratic Party, Catholics were staunch Democrats. The Democratic Party ran Al Smith, the first Catholic presidential candidate by a major party, in 1928, and, except when the ticket was headed by a Southern candidate, has nominated a Catholic for president or vice president in every election since 1960 except for 1988 (where a Greek Orthodox, Michael Dukakis, was the presidential nominee).

Since the 1960s, the Catholic vote has become bipartisan. In the 60s and early 70s, a number of Catholics and Southern whites abandoned their traditional affiliation with the Democratic Party and began to support the Republican Party. This shift is evidenced by the fact that Nixon received 33% of the Catholic vote in the 1968 election compared to 52% in 1972. As a group, Catholics represented a quarter of the nation's electorate and were now one of the nation's largest swing groups. Both parties began to aggressively woo the Catholic voters. Although the Catholic hierarchy could not dictate who Catholics voted for, they did have a substantial influence over the faithful in their dioceses. Politicians were aware that the bishops could direct significant time, energy and money to support the issues that were important to them. From their perspective, the bishops were eager to regain some of the influence that their predecessors had wielded in the earlier part of the 20th century. Since the 1970s non-Hispanic white Catholics have voted majority Republican very reliably while a majority of Hispanic or Latino Catholics have voted Democrat.

In his successful 1980 campaign against Jimmy Carter, Ronald Reagan won about half of the Catholic vote and a majority of Catholics who were non-Hispanic whites. "Reagan Democrats", many of them non-Hispanic white, blue-collar Catholics, often from a white ethnic background, comprised 25% of the Democrats who voted for Reagan, and formed an important part of his support in 1984 as well. Despite Catholic Geraldine Ferraro's presence on the Democratic ticket as Walter Mondale's vice-presidential running mate that year Reagan won 54 to 61% of the Catholic vote, only slightly different from the overall 59%. Although the majority of Catholics in 1984 remained Democrats, compared to 1980, Catholic votes switched to Reagan at about the same level as most Protestant groups. Reagan's vice president George H. W. Bush won about the same number of votes as Michael Dukakis, making 1988 the third presidential election in a row in which Catholics failed to support the Democratic candidate as they traditionally did.

Although about one-third of Catholics voted for Bush's reelection in 1992, most Catholic defectors switched to independent Ross Perot, not the successful Democrat Bill Clinton. Unlike previous elections (such as in 1972, when George McGovern's Catholic support was eight percentage points higher than overall) the Catholic vote was not more Democratic than the overall electorate, but split almost identically to it. The trend away from a Democratic dominance of the Catholic vote continued in 1994, when for the first time in history Democrats did not receive a majority of Catholic votes in elections for the House of Representatives; as with 1992, the Catholic vote split resembled that of the overall electorate. White non-Hispanic Catholics however, remained majority Republican. This trend reversed slightly in 1996, when Clinton's share of Catholics in general was four percentage points ahead of overall, and they comprised about half of the margin between him and the unsuccessful challenger Robert Dole. The 1990s ended, however, with Catholics as "the largest swing vote in American politics" and with white non-Hispanic Catholics continuing to vote consistently Republican.

Their party independence continued into 2000, and Catholics became the large religious grouping that most closely reflected the total electorate, ahead of mainline Protestants. 50% of Catholics voted for Al Gore versus 47% for George W. Bush in the very close 2000 election. 52% of Catholics voted for Bush's successful reelection compared to 47% for the Catholic John Kerry in 2004, versus 51% to 48% overall. Among white Catholics the figure was higher, with George W Bush receiving 56% of white Catholic votes. Barack Obama, who chose the Catholic Joe Biden as his running mate, received 54% of the Catholic vote in 2008 compared to John McCain's 45%, close to the overall 52% to 46%. In 2012 Obama and Biden faced Mitt Romney and the Catholic Paul Ryan. Obama won 50% of the Catholic vote to Romney's 48%, close to their 51% and 47%, respectively, of the overall vote. In 2016 the Republicans' Donald Trump chose Mike Pence—who describes himself as evangelical Catholic—as his running mate, while the Democrats' Hillary Clinton chose the Catholic Tim Kaine as hers. The victorious Trump-Pence ticket received 52% of Catholics' votes compared to Clinton-Kaine's 45%.

White Catholics who are registered Democrats are also shown to defect to the Republican Party in massive numbers during election years. This was particularly true during both of Ronald Reagan's presidential elections, as well as the Nixon-McGovern race. White Catholics who are registered as Republicans are substantially less likely to defect to the Democrats during election years.

Studies indicate that Catholics who disaffiliate from the Church due to clergy abuse scandals tend to experience a leftward shift in their political orientation. This shift is reflected not only in their personal political beliefs but also in their voting behavior, with former Catholics more likely to support progressive candidates and causes.

== Presidential elections ==
=== 1928 ===
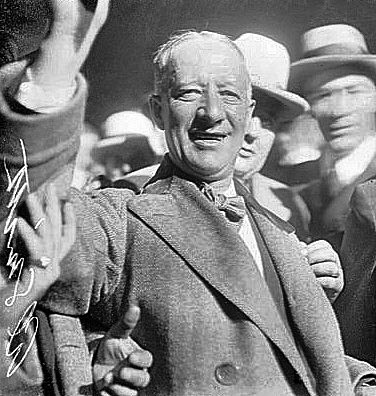
Al Smith was the first Catholic presidential candidate of a major party.

In 1928, Al Smith became the first Roman Catholic to gain a major party's nomination for president. His religion became an issue during the campaign and was one of the factors in his loss. Many feared that he would answer to the pope and not the constitution. Another major controversial issue was the continuation of Prohibition. Smith was personally in favor of relaxation or repeal of Prohibition laws despite its status as part of the nation's Constitution, but the Democratic Party split north and south on the issue. During the campaign Smith tried to duck the issue with noncommittal statements. He was also criticized for being a drunkard because of the stereotypes placed on Irish Catholics of the day.

Smith swept the entire Catholic vote, which had been split in 1920 and 1924, and brought millions of Catholics to the polls for the first time, especially women. The fact that Smith was Catholic garnered him support from immigrant populations in New England, which may explain his narrow victories in traditionally Republican Massachusetts and Rhode Island, as well as his narrow 2% loss in New York (which previous Democratic presidential candidates had lost by double digits).

=== 1960 ===
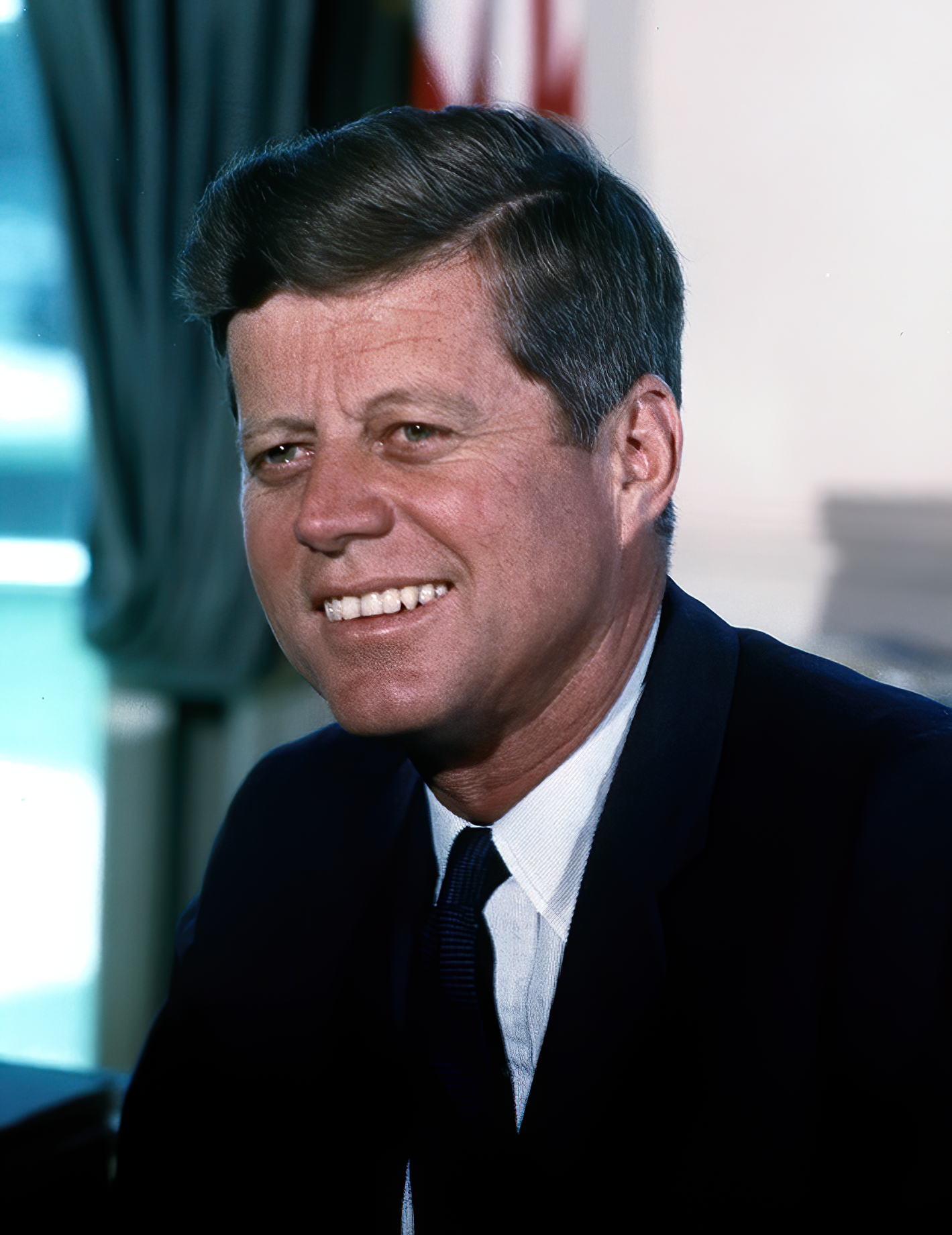
John F. Kennedy, 35th President of the United States

Religion became a divisive issue during the presidential campaign of 1960. Senator John F. Kennedy of Massachusetts was vying to become the nation's first Catholic president. A key factor that was hurting Kennedy in his campaign was the widespread prejudice against his Roman Catholic religion; some Protestants believed that, if he were elected president, Kennedy would have to take orders from the Pope in Rome. When offered the opportunity to speak before a convention of Baptist ministers, he decided to try to put the issue to rest.

To address fears that his Roman Catholicism would influence his decision-making, John F. Kennedy famously told the Greater Houston Ministerial Association on September 12, 1960, "I am not the Catholic candidate for President. I am the Democratic Party's candidate for President who also happens to be a Catholic. I do not speak for my Church on public matters — and the Church does not speak for me." He promised to respect the separation of church and state and not to allow Catholic officials to dictate public policy to him. Kennedy also raised the question of whether one-quarter of Americans were relegated to second-class citizenship just because they were Roman Catholic.

Even so, it was widely believed after the election that Kennedy lost some heavily Protestant states because of his Catholicism. His address did not please everyone: many non-Catholics remained unconvinced that a Catholic could be president without divided loyalties; and many Catholics thought he conceded too much in his profession of belief in an absolute separation of church and state. The speech is widely considered to be an important marker in the history of Catholicism (and anti-Catholicism) in the United States.

Kennedy went on to win the national popular vote over Richard Nixon by just one-tenth of one percentage point (0.1%) - the closest popular-vote margin of the 20th century. In the electoral college, Kennedy's victory was larger, as he took 303 electoral votes to Nixon's 219 (269 were needed to win). There was a "narrow consensus" among the experts that Kennedy had won more votes than he lost as a result of his Catholicism, as Catholics rallied to Kennedy as an affirmation of their religion and their right to have a Catholic president.

=== Summary of results ===
This chart shows the estimated Democrat/Republican split of the Catholic vote in elections since 1948. Catholic candidates are in bold. However, ex-Catholic candidates (Palin, Pence & Walz) aren't. Elections in which Catholics voted for the national winner are also in bold.

| Year | Election Winner | Party | D% | R% | Election Loser | Cook PVI | Citations |
|---|---|---|---|---|---|---|---|
| 1948 | Truman–Barkley | Democratic | **65** | 35 | Dewey–Warren | D+30 | |
| 1952 | Eisenhower–Nixon | Republican | 51-56 | 44-49 | Stevenson–Sparkman | D+2-12 | |
| 1956 | Eisenhower–Nixon | Republican | 45-51 | 49-55 | Stevenson–Kefauver | R+10–D+2 | |
| 1960 | **Kennedy**–Johnson | Democratic | **78-82** | 18-22 | Nixon–Lodge | D+56–64 | |
| 1964 | Johnson–Humphrey | Democratic | **76-79** | 21-24 | Goldwater–**Miller** | D+52–58 | |
| 1968 | Nixon–Agnew | Republican | 49-59 (Note: Because of 3rd party candidate, 'General Social Survey' showed 49% dem vs 43% rep, so Catholics still voted democrat but only plurality not majority.) | 33-38 | Humphrey–**Muskie** | D+11–26 | |
| 1972 | Nixon–Agnew | Republican | 37-48 | **52-63** | McGovern–**Shriver** (Note: Thomas Eagleton, George McGovern's initial running mate, was Catholic just like Shriver was.) | R+4–26 | |
| 1976 | Carter–Mondale | Democratic | **54-57** | 40-44 | Ford–Dole | D+10–17 | |
| 1980 | Reagan–Bush | Republican | 41-49 | 41-50 | Carter–Mondale | R+9–D+8 | |
| 1984 | Reagan–Bush | Republican | 38-46 | **54-61** | Mondale–**Ferraro** | R+8–23 | |
| 1988 | Bush–Quayle | Republican | 38-52 | 48-61 | Dukakis–Bentsen | R+23-D+4 | |
| 1992 | Clinton–Gore | Democratic | **44-50** | 30-37 | Bush–Quayle | D+7-20 | |
| 1996 | Clinton–Gore | Democratic | **53-57** | 30-37 | Dole–Kemp | D+16–27 | |
| 2000 | Bush–Cheney | Republican | 42-52 | 46-56 | Gore–Lieberman | R+14-D+6 | |
| 2004 | Bush–Cheney | Republican | 44-52 | 44-52 | **Kerry**–Edwards | R+8–D+8 | |
| 2008 | Obama–**Biden** | Democratic | **53-58** | 40-47 | McCain–Palin | D+6–18 | |
| 2012 | Obama–**Biden** | Democratic | **49-59** (Note: There's no 3rd party candidate, but Gallup showed 49% dem vs 48% rep, so Catholics still voted democrat but only plurality not majority.) | 39-48 | Romney–**Ryan** | D+1–20 | |
| 2016 | Trump–Pence | Republican | 45-49 | 45-52 | Clinton–**Kaine** | R+4–D+7 | |
| 2020 | **Biden**–Harris | Democratic | 49-52 | 47-50 | Trump–Pence | R+1–D+5 | |
| 2024 | Trump–**Vance** | Republican | 39-44 | **55-59** | Harris–Walz | R+11-20 | |

== Representation in government ==
=== Congress ===
According to the Pew Research Center, Catholics represent 30.5% of the United States Congress as of January 2019. There are 141 Representatives and 22 Senators that are Catholic, which split as 99 Democrats and 64 Republicans.

Edward Kavanagh was nationally noticed as the first Catholic elected from New England in 1830. Kavanagh was elected as a Jacksonian to the Twenty-second and Twenty-third Congresses, serving from March 4, 1831, to March 3, 1835.

On January 4, 2007, Nancy Pelosi, a Catholic, became the first woman elected as the Speaker of the House. She was elected again as Speaker of the House on January 3, 2019, after serving as House Minority Leader for the Democrats from 2003 to 2007 and 2011–2019. Paul Ryan is Catholic as well and served recently as Speaker of the House from 2015 to 2019.

=== Supreme Court ===
A majority of the Supreme Court has been Catholic since 2005.

The first Catholic Supreme Court appointment was Chief Justice Roger B. Taney, appointed by Andrew Jackson in 1836. The second, Edward Douglass White, joined the court in 1894 and was elevated to chief justice in 1910. He was joined on the Court by Catholic Joseph McKenna in 1898. After White's death in 1921, there became an informally recognized tradition of holding one seat on the court for a Catholic justice, though not necessarily the same seat.

Pierce Butler was appointed to the court in 1923 and was succeeded by Frank Murphy in 1940. Both were Catholic. During Murphy's time on the court, he was briefly joined by James F. Byrnes, who was raised Catholic but had converted to Episcopalianism many years before his appointment.

After Murphy died in 1949, he was not succeeded directly by a Catholic. However, President Harry Truman appointed Sherman Minton to a different vacant seat, and his appointment was seen as in keeping with the tradition, as Minton's wife was Catholic. He would convert five years after his retirement from the court.

Upon Minton's retirement, Cardinal Francis Spellman successfully lobbied Dwight Eisenhower to replace him with William J. Brennan, a practicing Catholic.

The traditional one-seat rule was abandoned by President Ronald Reagan, who nominated two Catholics to serve together: Antonin Scalia in 1986 and Anthony Kennedy in 1988. They joined Brennan to give the court a then-high of three Catholic justices.

President George H.W. Bush nominated Clarence Thomas in 1991. At the time of his appointment, Thomas was a confirmed Catholic attending Episcopalian services, but he has since returned to active Catholicism. He replaced the retiring Catholic Brennan with David Souter, an Episcopalian.

President George W. Bush appointed John Roberts and Samuel Alito, both Catholics, in 2005. Alito's appointment gave the court its first ever Catholic majority, which it has maintained ever since. (Note: For a two-month period following the retirement of Anthony Kennedy on July 31, 2018, there were four Catholic justices on an eight-member court. However, the court did not hear any cases during that time.) In 2009, President Barack Obama appointed Catholic Sonia Sotomayor, raising the number of Catholic justices to six.

In 2018, President Donald Trump appointed Catholic Brett Kavanaugh to replace Anthony Kennedy. Trump's other appointment thus far, Neil Gorsuch, is a practicing Episcopalian who had attended Catholic Mass and Catholic schools as a child. He joined the Episcopal Church upon marriage to his wife. It is unclear whether he still identifies as Catholic, and he is not typically included among the Catholic justices. In 2020, Justice Ruth Bader Ginsburg died; President Donald Trump nominated Amy Coney Barrett, a Catholic, to fill the vacancy; she was subsequently confirmed by the Senate and sworn in to the bench.

=== Executive branch ===
There have been two Catholic President of the United States, John F. Kennedy and Joe Biden and two Vice Presidents of the United States, Joe Biden and JD Vance; however, Mike Pence was raised Catholic, but later described himself as an Evangelical Catholic. There are also 2 ex-Catholic vice presidential candidates, namely Sarah Palin & Tim Walz.

First Lady Melania Trump was the first Catholic to live in the White House since First Lady Jacqueline Kennedy, who remained there for two weeks after her husband's death 53 years earlier.

==== Cabinet members ====
Postmasters General: James Farley (1933-1940

Secretaries of State: Edmund Muskie, Alexander Haig, John Kerry, John J. Sullivan, and current secretary Marco Rubio. Secretary James G. Blaine had Catholic roots. Secretary James F. Byrnes was raised Catholic but converted to Episcopalianism.

Attorneys General: Roger B. Taney, Joseph McKenna, Charles Bonaparte, Frank Murphy, James McGranery, J. Howard McGrath, Robert F. Kennedy, William Barr, and Alberto Gonzales.

Secretaries of Defense: James Forrestal, Leon Panetta, and James Mattis. Secretary Chuck Hagel was raised Catholic but converted to Episcopalianism.

Secretaries of Labor: Maurice Tobin, Martin Durkin, James P. Mitchell, Ann McLaughlin Korologos, Alexis Herman, Hilda Solis, and Tom Perez.

Secretaries of Housing and Urban Development: Moon Landrieu, Henry Cisneros, Andrew Cuomo, Mel Martínez, and Julián Castro.

Secretaries of Energy: Bill Richardson.

Secretary of the Treasury and of the Interior Thomas Ewing married a Catholic woman, attended services for many years, and was formally baptized on his deathbed. Treasury Secretary Donald Regan also had Catholic roots, but it is unclear whether he actively practiced while in office.

The Catholic secretaries in the Biden administration were Lloyd Austin (Defense), Deb Haaland (Interior), Gina Raimondo (Commerce), Marty Walsh (Labor), Xavier Becerra (Health and Human Services), Miguel Cardona (Education), and Jennifer Granholm (Energy). Haaland was the first Native American in a presidential cabinet and also the first Native Catholic within it. Granholm converted to Catholicism while at Harvard Law School in the mid-1980s.

Secretary of Transportation Pete Buttigieg was baptized in the Catholic Church as an infant and he attended Catholic schools, but began to attend the Church of England's Christ Church Cathedral during his term at the University of Oxford and said he felt "more-or-less Anglican" by the time he returned to the U.S. Buttigieg has since been an Episcopalian.

=== Mayors of leading cities ===
Of the 15 leading American cities, 7 elected a Catholic as mayor before the Civil War, and 13 had done so by 1893. The last two were Edward Dempsey in Cincinnati in 1906, and James Tate in Philadelphia in 1962.

1815 Augustin McCarty, New Orleans
1824 John Williams, Detroit
1842 Solomon Hillman, Baltimore
1844 Bernard Pratte, St Louis
1846 Solomin Juneau, Milwaukee
1853 Antonio F. Coronel, Los Angeles
1856 Thomas Dyer, Chicago
1867 Frank McCoppin, San Francisco
1876 Philip Becker, Buffalo
1881 William Russell Grace, New York City
1885 Hugh O'Brien, Boston
1893 Robert Blee, Cleveland
1893 Bernard J. McKenna Pittsburgh
1906 Edward Dempsey, Cincinnati
1962 James Tate, Philadelphia

== See also ==
- Anti-abortion movement
- Anti-Catholicism
  - Anti-Catholicism in the United States
- Catholic Church in the United States
  - History of the Catholic Church in the United States
- Catholic Democrats
- Christianity and politics
  - Christianity in the United States
  - History of Christianity in the United States
- Identity politics
- Jewish views and involvement in US politics
- Latino vote
- Political Catholicism
- Religion in politics
- Religion in the United States
  - Freedom of religion in the United States
  - History of religion in the United States
  - Religious discrimination in the United States

== Bibliography ==
- Casey, Shaun. The Making of a Catholic President: Kennedy vs. Nixon 1960 (2009)
- Cochran, Clarke E. and David Carroll Cochran. Catholics, Politics, and Public Policy: Beyond Left and Right (2003)
- Dolan, Jay. The Irish Americans: A History (2008)
- Heyer, Kristin E., Mark J. Rozell, and Michael A. Genovese. Catholics and Politics: The Dynamic Tension Between Faith and Power (2008)
- Marlin, George J., and Michael Barone, American Catholic Voter: Two Hundred Years Of Political Impact (2006)
- Morris, Charles. American Catholic: The Saints and Sinners Who Built America's Most Powerful Church (1998)
- Prendergast, William B. The Catholic Voter in American Politics: The Passing of the Democratic Monolith (1999)
- Woolner, David B., and Richard G. Kurial. FDR, the Vatican, and the Roman Catholic Church in America, 1933-1945 (2003)
