= Catholic Democrats =

American political organization

Catholic Democrats is an American not-for-profit organization of Catholics to support the Democratic Party, based in Boston, United States. The Catholic Democrats have more than 60,000 members in all 50 American states and Puerto Rico. It claims no authorization from the Catholic Church, or any Catholic bishop, Catholic diocese, candidate or candidate committee.

The organization was founded in response to the 2004 presidential election, which, in the view of the group, had witnessed unprecedented attempts to bend Catholic social teaching to accommodate policies which are in conflict with the teaching and values of the Church. It characterizes its membership as people who share an aversion to the kind of abuses of U.S. military power that led to the Iraq War, along with "the exploitation of social issues to advance the economic interests of a few, and the misuse of our Catholic faith for political gain."

The group was angered as well by what it perceived as manipulation of Church teaching to the advantage of conservative and Republican interests: "Conservatives have increasingly used Catholic language and Catholic congregations to advance their economic agenda and political interests," particularly its insistence on “a consistent moral framework anchored in the scriptures and expressed in the teachings of the Church.” The group specifies the bishops' call for a new commitment to advancing public policies that work in the interest of the common good.

Catholic Democrats support Pope Leo XIV's stances on the central issues within Catholic social teaching ("war, poverty, unintended pregnancy, preventable illness, the death penalty, instability of the family, and supporting the dialogue balancing medical advances and the dignity of the individual") which it feels that the Republican Party neglects in favor of others, notably abortion, euthanasia and homosexuality.

== History ==
=== Involvement with 2008 presidential election ===
During the 2008 presidential election, the organization launched the Catholics for Barack Obama website, which included a petition of endorsement for Catholics to sign in support of Democratic Party nominee Barack Obama's candidacy, the Catholic questions and answers on abortion, and a welcome by Catholic actor Martin Sheen. Additionally, the Web site included links to the book, written by Catholic Democrats President Patrick Whelan with a preface by Victoria Reggie Kennedy, entitled The Catholic Case for Obama. The group helped articulate a new approach to the abortion problem, also championed by the Obama Campaign, that focused on reduction strategies and emphasized finding common ground solutions.

=== Obama's first term ===
In 2009 the group applauded efforts by the Obama administration to reach out to Catholics, particularly in a major policy address President Obama made at Georgetown University on April 14, 2009, and in his commencement address on May 17, 2009, at the University of Notre Dame. Catholic conservatives had attacked Notre Dame for inviting President Obama, going as far as to organize an alternate commencement rally that featured a speech by Fr. Bill Miscamble—a Notre Dame historian who later wrote a highly critical biography of Fr. Theodore Hesburgh. In response, Catholic Democrats wrote a national Letter of Support for President Obama, Notre Dame, and Catholic higher education that was signed by thousands of Catholics across the country. The group also launched the website, Catholics for Notre Dame, which housed the statement of support, a music video called Catholic in America, and a tool for individuals to send letters to the editor. They helped organize a reunion for the Catholic priests and community organizers who hired President Obama to work in a Catholic church rectory on the South Side of Chicago in 1985. The Catholic Democrats president, Dr. Patrick Whelan, defended the university's invitation to President Obama in an appearance on MSNBC's "Countdown" with Keith Olbermann, and he wrote an opinion piece that appeared the Friday before the Notre Dame Commencement in the Chicago Tribune. Catholic Democrats also worked with local Democratic officials in South Bend, Indiana the weekend of the commencement to organize a welcome rally for President Obama and a food drive, in the spirit of national service struck at the Inauguration.

In the summer of 2009, Catholic Democrats launched the website, "Pope Greets Hope" to celebrate President Obama's first meeting with Pope Benedict XVI on July 11, 2009. Dr. Whelan blogged from the Vatican during the meeting, which followed the release of the papal encyclical Caritas in Veritate and the 35th G8 summit in L'Aquila, Italy, earlier in the week. In August 2009, the organization paid tribute to the late U.S. Senator Edward M. Kennedy (D-Mass.), who had been a great inspiration to the founders of the group. The group has more recently paid tribute to Sargent Shriver, a founder of the Peace Corps, and Fr. Thomas Kaminski, a Chicago priest who was president of the community development organization that hired Barack Obama in 1985.

In September 2009, the leadership of Catholic Democrats met with the White House Domestic Policy Council in an effort to find creative and constructive solutions to decreasing the number of abortions in the United States.

==== Health care reform ====
In 2010, Catholic Democrats president Dr. Patrick Whelan published a study that appeared in the New England Journal of Medicine and asserted that the number of abortions in Massachusetts decreased after the 2006 passage of universal health care there. Additionally, national director Steve Krueger wrote a policy paper on health care and abortion. Catholic Democrats also sent a letter to all Catholic members of the U.S. Congress asking them to give up divisive partisan rhetoric for Lent and to pass health care reform by Easter. Additionally, the organization asked Catholics to sign a petition that called on Congress to pass health care reform.

==== Activism on poverty and wealth disparity ====
For the 2010 midterm elections, Catholic Democrats issued A Catholic Pledge to America, which called on Catholic voters to support candidates whose policies reflect Catholic social justice. Additionally, the organization issued a voter's guide that contrasted the accomplishments of the Democratic Congress with the Republican Pledge to America. National director Steve Krueger and board member Kathleen Kennedy Townsend appeared on the PBS program Religion & Ethics Newsweekly. In July 2011, Mr. Krueger became president of Catholic Democrats.

In the fall of 2011 as the presidential primaries approached, Catholic Democrats sent a letter to then-Archbishop Timothy Dolan, president of the USCCB, detailing the theological flaws in arguments by House Budget Committee Chairman Paul Ryan (R-WI) in favor of a federal austerity budget that proposed drastic cuts in healthcare, food stamps, and other services for the poor. The organization asked the U.S. bishops to vigorously address the challenges of increased poverty, unemployment and income inequality, and to reaffirm the principles that the U.S. bishops unambiguously laid out in the 1980s and again in the 1990s in their pastoral letter, Economic Justice for All. Archbishop Dolan replied in a letter to the leaders of Catholic Democrats, “One of the reasons defense of religious liberty is such a high priority is because this is necessary to protect our efforts in the promotion of charity, justice, peace, service, and advocacy. Likewise, I worry when any attempt to dialogue with Republicans is interpreted as turning one’s back on the poor. Nevertheless, I very much welcome your comments and have taken them seriously.”

In part because all the Republican presidential candidates opposed the administration's job creation and anti-poverty proposals, and chose to attack expanded healthcare access, Catholic Democrats became deeply involved in the 2012 presidential election. According to Archbishop Charles Chaput of Philadelphia, responding to a question from Dr. Whelan at a public forum at Assumption College in Worcester, the US bishops did not have time at their upcoming November 2011 meeting to discuss the plight of the poor and the state of the national economy. But the bishops did spend the majority of that meeting planning and launching a campaign against the Obama administration centered on the idea that the government was responsible for an attack on religious liberty.

That campaign focused on gay marriage, and later on whether employees of Catholic hospitals and universities should have insurance coverage for contraception. In a February 2012 interview on C-SPAN, Catholic Democrats Board member Kathleen Kennedy Townsend strongly supported the administration's efforts to provide wider access to contraceptives, with their potential for decreasing the number of abortions. But in an opinion piece the same week in the Philadelphia Inquirer, Archbishop Chaput said that the administration was motivated by “a seemingly deep distrust of the formative role religious faith has on personal and social conduct, and a deep distaste for religion's moral influence on public affairs.” The Inquirer subsequently interviewed Catholic Democrats’ president Steve Krueger, and reported this exchange of views with Archbishop Chaput: “While there's nothing wrong with a Catholic bishop being a Republican or a Democrat,” Krueger said, “there's something eerily unsettling when the archbishop's political affiliation and the teaching authority he rightfully claims conflate, so that he becomes more of a partisan political figure than a shepherd." Told of Krueger's criticism, Chaput became visibly annoyed and leaned forward in his chair. "Can a group that calls itself 'Catholic Democrats' talk about politicizing things? That's absolutely ridiculous." Asked if he had a preferred candidate in the presidential elections, Chaput allowed a small smile and shook his head. "I don't talk about candidates," he said. "I just talk about the issues.”

Catholic Democrats took to the air on Public Radio, syndicated Spanish-language radio, and the mainstream print media to support the United States Department of Health and Human Services decision to provide broader access to contraception. Columnist Bill Press, citing Catholic Democrats’ concerns about the bishops’ neglect for poverty-related issues, wrote in April 2012, “When I was growing up a Catholic, the nuns had a phrase for those who obeyed some tenets of the Church but not others: ‘Cafeteria Catholics.’ Today, the biggest ‘Cafeteria Catholics’ are Catholic bishops.”

Catholic Democrats opposed the use of churches to support the Republican presidential ticket. In a study of the matter, Catholic Democrats estimated that the commercial communications value of the USCCB's unprecedented "religious liberty" campaign in 2012 was likely to fall between $60 million and $100 million, based on the estimated percentage of partisan homilies heard by the 26 million Catholics attending mass each week. “If the USCCB were a Super PAC, the value of its campaign would likely top the list of independent expenditure organizations,” said Mr. Krueger in the Huffington Post.

Also in 2012, Catholic Democrats opposed efforts to politicize Catholic parishes by reaching out directly to all the parishes in Governor Romney's home state of Massachusetts and in the battleground state of Virginia, outlining for pastors the USCCB's own guidelines forbidding electioneering by political parties in Catholic parishes.

Gov. Romney chose U.S. Representative Paul Ryan, a Catholic, as his running mate in August 2012. Catholic Democrats pointed out the inconsistencies between Rep Ryan's previous budget proposals and the Catholic “preferential option for the poor,” citing opposition from a wide array of Catholic theologians and other professors, Catholic nuns, and Bishops Stephen Blaire and Howard Hubbard. “The selection of U.S. Representative Paul Ryan as Mitt Romney’s running mate puts the Ryan budget, the role of the Catholic Social Justice Tradition, and the ways we as a society can help the poor at the center of this campaign,” said Professor Nick Cafardi, a member of the board of Catholic Democrats.

When Rep. Ryan met Vice President Joseph Biden in a historic televised debate between two Catholic vice presidential candidates, Catholic Democrats hosted debate watch parties across the country preceded by a roundtable conference call discussion featuring Sr. Simone Campbell of Network, Dean Cafardi, and Dr. Whelan from Catholic Democrats. The focus of that discussion was rising poverty and the differences between the two campaigns on strategies to accelerate the recovery of the U.S. economy.

=== “America Undecided: Catholic, Independent and Social Justice Perspectives on Election 2012" ===
In the fall of 2012, Dr. Whelan joined forces with two former University of Notre Dame law professors and law school deans, Douglas Kmiec and Ed Gaffney, to write the book "America Undecided: Catholic, Independent and Social Justice Perspectives on Election 2012." Prof Gaffney is a religious liberty scholar and Prof Kmiec a nationally known constitutional law expert. They argued that there was no merit to the idea that the Obama administration was opposed to religious liberty or hostile to Catholicism. The book begins by chronicling the Catholic influence on the early life of President Barack Obama, who attended Catholic school in Jakarta Indonesia as a child. His mother, Ann Dunham, worked collaboratively for 20 years with a Dutch Jesuit in a Catholic vocational school in Jakarta, trying to advance the economic prospects of a population emerging there from colonialism. Dr. Whelan interviewed a group of Catholic priests who had hired Mr. Obama in 1985 to work in Chicago Catholic parishes as a community organizer.

The book goes on to explore the details of the USCCB's turnabout on the expansion of health insurance availability, and ultimately their opposition to the historic 2010 Affordable Care Act. It discusses the role of nuns such as Sr. Simone Campbell of Network and Sr. Carol Keehan of the Catholic Health Association of the United States in ultimately helping pass the legislation, and the subsequent efforts by the Church to censure the nuns. Finally, it explores the details of the Church's opposition to the contraception mandate, and their mislabeling of some contraceptives as “abortifacients.” They debunk the idea that the government's efforts to provide contraception coverage to all women, including those who work for Catholic hospitals and universities, constitutes an attack on religious freedom or a violation of the Constitution's separation of church and state.

A subsequent opinion piece in October 2012 by Dr. Whelan and Catholic Democrats Board member Kathleen Kennedy Townsend explored Governor Romney's opposition to providing healthcare coverage for all Americans.

President Obama and Vice-president Biden prevailed over Gov Romney and Rep Ryan, 51-47%, in the general popular vote. Catholics were as likely as the general population to vote for President Obama, with exit polling showing 51% supporting the Democrats and 48% for the Republican ticket. The Catholic majority for Obama was heavily dependent on Latino Catholics, who supported Obama 76-23%. Romney won among non-Hispanic white Catholics 56 to 43%. This contrasted with non-Hispanic white Protestants who favored Romney 69-29%. By comparison, Obama won the 2008 election with 53% of the general vote, compared with 46% for Senator John McCain. Catholics voted for Obama 54 to 45%, with non-Hispanic white Catholics favoring McCain 52 to 47% and Latino Catholic favoring Obama 72 – 26%. Exit polls have shown a progressive drop in non-Hispanic white Catholics over each of the last four elections as a percentage of those who voted, though the overall percentage of Catholics among voters has held constant at 27%.

=== Obama's second term ===
==== Racial justice efforts ====
In August 2013, Catholic Democrats teamed up with leaders from the US Bishops’ Office of African American Affairs, the Catholic Campaign for Human Development, the Roman Catholic Archdiocese of Washington, and other Catholic organizations to host an event in conjunction with the 50th commemoration of the March on Washington for Jobs and Freedom and Rev. Martin Luther King Jr.’s speech "I Have a Dream". An opening mass of celebration featured the Gospel Choir of Holy Redeemer Parish in Washington DC, with a homily by Fr. David Bava surveying the history of Catholic efforts related to slavery and civil rights. A wide-ranging discussion entitled, “A Catholic Conversation on Race, Religion and the March on Washington” was moderated by Ralph McCloud, the director of the USCCB's Catholic Campaign for Human Development. The discussants included United States Secretary of Labor Thomas Perez, National Pax Christi USA President Sr. Patricia Chappell, John Carr (Director of the Initiative on Catholic Social Thought & Public Life at Georgetown University), and USCCB Assistant Director for African American Affairs Donna Toliver Grimes. The event filled Holy Redeemer Church, and was well-received as the only public celebration of the role of Catholics in the Civil Rights Movement. Catholic Democrats President Krueger, who conceived the event, was quoted in the National Catholic Reporter, saying it "was intended to be a bridge between Catholic involvement in the civil rights movement of the 1960s and the unfinished business of the 1963 march today based on the Catholic social justice tradition. It is a 'next first step' on a journey that we hope may serve as an impetus for a national conversation on racial justice in parishes, dioceses and faith-based communities across our land."

==== 2014 midterm elections ====
In 2014, Catholic Democrats conducted a Get Out the Vote (GOTV) campaign asking Catholic voters to consider the moral messages of Pope Francis, and his focus on poverty, as they were preparing to vote in the 2014 midterm elections. The organization produced radio advertisements featuring James Roosevelt Jr., the grandson of Franklin Delano Roosevelt and Eleanor Roosevelt, and Martin Sheen. The radio ads were played on Pandora Internet radio in the states of Kentucky and New Hampshire. The radio ads were a part of Catholic Democrats' 2014 "Be Connected" campaign. Pandora rated these advertisements as among the highest rated political ads for 2014 in terms of listener engagement.

==== 2015 conference call ====
Catholic Democrats hosted a national conference call on the eve of Pope Francis's visit to the United States in September 2015, featuring Sr. Mary Johnson, SND, PhD, Distinguished Prof. of Sociology and Religious Studies at Trinity Washington University, and Fr. Tom Reese SJ, of the National Catholic Reporter. The group launched a prayer petition for the pope, and President Steve Krueger represented the organization at the White House reception for Pope Francis.

=== 2016 presidential election ===
In 2016 Catholic Democrats supported the candidacy of Secretary Hillary Clinton for president. Although she appears to have won the overall Catholic vote, according to a research center at Georgetown University, she ended up losing the non-Hispanic white Catholic vote—which may have played a pivotal role in the loss of traditional Democratic Midwestern states like Michigan, Wisconsin, Ohio and Pennsylvania that have large and older Catholic populations. Catholics tend to vote in higher numbers than the general population, which may have contributed to an outsized effect of the white Catholic preference for Donald Trump. Professor Thomas Groome of Boston College published an opinion piece in The New York Times arguing that the Democrats need to reach out to people of faith on the abortion issue by championing their successful efforts to decrease abortions dramatically through the eight years of the Obama presidency. His essay inspired more than 2500 comments, and the Times published a Q&A with responses by Professor Groome and Steven Krueger, president of Catholic Democrats.

=== During the Trump presidency ===
==== Further health care efforts ====
Because Catholic Democrats has long championed greater access to health care as a right advocated by Pope Francis and the Catholic Social Justice tradition, the group mobilized its members in opposition to Republican efforts to overturn the Affordable Care Act. The American Health Care Act (AHCA, Ryan healthcare bill) was withdrawn from consideration in the House of Representatives on March 24, 2017, preserving health insurance for 25 million people who otherwise would have lost it, according to the Congressional Budget Office.

==== 2017 special Senate election in Alabama ====
Responding to the child abuse allegations made against Alabama Republican Senate candidate Roy Moore, Catholic Democrats undertook an advertising campaign appealing to Catholics in Alabama to respond forcefully to the lessons learned from the Catholic clergy abuse crisis, and to support Moore's opponent Democrat Doug Jones. On December 12, 2017, former US Attorney Doug Jones won an upset victory over Moore in the special election to fill the seat vacated by US Attorney General Jeff Sessions.

=== 2020 presidential election ===
In 2020, Catholic Democrats launched a campaign in support of Joe Biden after he won the Democratic nomination, publishing The Catholic Case for Joe Biden and working with theologians around the country to infuse local and national Democratic election efforts with the spirit of the Catholic Social Justice Tradition. Catholic voters were evenly split between Donald Trump and Joe Biden, though Trump's backing by white Catholics dropped compared to 2016 from 64% to 57% -- and 67% of Latino Catholics voted for Biden.

=== Catholics for Kamala ===
In 2024, Patrick Whelan joined with Catholics Vote Common Good, a project of Vote Common Good, to launch Catholics for Kamala in order to combat the well-funded efforts of Republican Catholic outreach. Dr Whelan and Kathleen Kennedy Townsend wrote a book entitled, The Catholic Case for Kamala, which focuses on the Democrats' commitment to addressing the global climate crisis, in the spirit of Pope Francis's 2015 encyclical Laudato Si'. They also explored at length the complexities of the reproductive issues, and showed how powerfully Democratic efforts to provide broader access to healthcare had driven down the abortion rate before the previous historical trends were reversed under the Trump administration and then further accelerated in the wake of the Dobbs decision at the Supreme Court. Comedian Jimmy Tingle recorded radio ads for The Catholic Case for Kamala that played across the swing states. The group co-sponsored nightly national prayer novenas by Zoom with Catholic Vote Common Good in the week before the election. With the death of Pope Francis, the group applauded the elevation of Pope Leo XIV and the continued movement toward a more inclusive Church.

== See also ==
- American Values Network
- Catholic Church in the United States
- Catholics in Alliance for the Common Good
- Center for Public Justice
- Faith in Public Life
