= List of Donald Trump 2024 presidential campaign political endorsements =

A range of notable individual politicians and political organizations endorsed Donald Trump for the 2024 U.S. presidential election.

== See also ==
- List of Donald Trump 2024 presidential campaign endorsements
- List of Kamala Harris 2024 presidential campaign political endorsements
