= 20th-century history of the Catholic Church in the United States =

The 20th-century history of the Catholic Church in the United States was characterized by a period of continuous growth for the Church in the United States, with Catholics progressively evolving from a small minority to a large minority.

== Early 20th century ==
In 1900 the Catholic population was 10 million, under the control of 14 Archbishops, 77 bishops, and 12,000 priests. The community had built 10,000 churches, of which two-thirds had resident pastors. Catholic schools educated nearly 1,000,000 children and youth. Catholics were heavily concentrated in the industrial and mining centers of the Northeast; few were farmers and only a small fraction lived in the South, chiefly in Louisiana. Catholics comprised less than one in 7 of the national population of 76 million.

=== National Catholic War Council ===
It was John J. Burke, editor of the Catholic World, who first recognized the urgency of the moment. Burke had long argued for a national outlook and sense of unity among the country's Catholics. The war provided the impetus to initiate these efforts. The Catholic hierarchy was eager to show its enthusiastic support for the war effort. In order to better address challenges posed by World War I, the American Catholic hierarchy in 1917 chose to meet collectively for the first time since 1884. In August 1917, on the campus of The Catholic University of America in Washington, Burke, with the backing of Cardinal Gibbons and other bishops, convened a meeting to discuss organizing a national agency to coordinate the war effort of the American Catholic community. One hundred and fifteen delegates from sixty-eight dioceses, together with members from the Catholic press and representatives from twenty-seven national Catholic organizations attended this first meeting. It set up the National Catholic War Council, "to study, coordinate, unify and put in operation all Catholic activities incidental to the war." An executive committee, chaired by Cardinal George Mundelein of Chicago, was formed in December 1917, to oversee the work of the Council. The mandate of the newly formed organization included the promotion of Catholic participation in the war, through chaplains, literature, and care for the morale of the troops, as well as (for the first time) lobbying for Catholic interests in the nation's capital.

As the war ended liberals hoped that a new commitment to social reform would characterize the ensuing peace. The Council saw an opportunity to use its national voice to shape reform and in April 1918 created a Committee for Reconstruction. John A. Ryan wrote the "Bishops' Program of Social Reconstruction." It was issued to the public on February 12, 1919, through a carefully planned public relations campaign. The plan offered a guide for overhauling America's politics, society, and economy based on Pope Leo XIII's Rerum novarum and a variety of influences reflecting the Progressive Era in the U.S..

The Program received a mixed reception both within the Church and outside it. The National Catholic War Council was a voluntary organization with no canonical status. Its ability to speak authoritatively was thus questioned. Many bishops threw their support behind the Program, while Bishop William Turner of Buffalo and William Henry O'Connell of Boston, among others, opposed it. O'Connell believed some aspects of the plan smacked too much of socialism. Response outside the Church was also divided: labor organizations backing it, for example, and business groups criticizing it.

=== 28th International Eucharistic Congress ===
In 1926, Chicago hosted the 28th International Eucharistic Congress, the first international eucharistic congress held in the United States and the second to be held in North America.

=== 1928 Presidential election ===
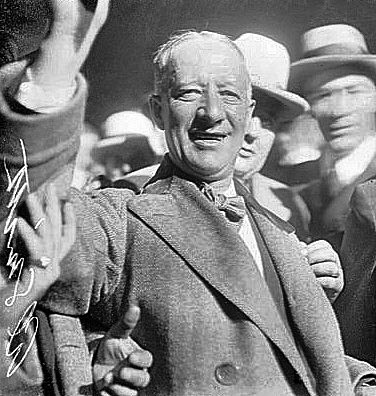
Al Smith

In 1928, Al Smith became the first Roman Catholic to gain a major party's nomination for president, and his religion became an issue during the campaign. Many Protestants feared that Smith would take orders from church leaders in Rome in making decisions affecting the country. Smith was from New York City, with strong ties to the Democratic machine known as Tammany Hall. To top it off, he was a wet who strongly opposed national prohibition.

=== National Catholic Welfare Conference ===
The National Catholic Welfare Council (NCWC) began in 1919 as the annual meeting of the American Catholic hierarchy and its standing secretariat. It consists of a staff of clergy as well as committees of bishops who discussed and sometimes issued statements on matters of national policy such as education, welfare, and health care.

It split into the National Conference of Catholic Bishops and the United States Catholic Conference. Today it is the United States Conference of Catholic Bishops (USCCB).

=== Parochial schools ===
In 1900, the Church supported 3,500 parochial schools, usually under the control of the local parish. By 1920, the number of elementary schools had reached 6,551, enrolling 1,759, 673 pupils taught by 41, 581 teachers. Secondary education likewise boomed. In 1900, there were only about 100 Catholic high schools, but by 1920 more than 1,500 were in operation. For more than two generations, enrollment continued to climb.

The Association of Catholic Colleges and Universities was founded in 1899, In 1904, Catholic educators formed an organization to coordinate their efforts on a national scale: the Catholic Educational Association which later changed its name to the National Catholic Educational Association.

==== Threats ====
After World War I, some states concerned about the influence of immigrants and "foreign" values looked to public schools for help. The states drafted lawsdesigned to use schools to promote a common American culture.

In 1921, the Ku Klux Klan attracted as many as 14,000 members in Oregon, establishing 58 klaverns by the end of 1922. Given the small population of non-white minorities outside Portland, the Oregon Klan directed its attention almost exclusively against Catholics, who numbered about 8% of the population.

In 1922, the Masonic Grand Lodge of Oregon sponsored a bill to require all school-age children to attend public schools. With support of the Klan and Democratic Governor Walter M. Pierce, endorsed by the Klan, the Compulsory Education Act was passed by a vote of 115,506 to 103,685. Its primary purpose was to shut down Catholic schools in Oregon, but it also affected other private and military schools. The constitutionality of the law was challenged in court and ultimately struck down by the Supreme Court in Pierce v. Society of Sisters (1925) before it went into effect.

The law caused outraged Catholics to organize locally and nationally for the right to send their children to Catholic schools. In Pierce v. Society of Sisters (1925), the United States Supreme Court declared the Oregon's Compulsory Education Act unconstitutional in a ruling that has been called "the Magna Carta of the parochial school system."

The Catholic leadership in 1924 mobilized to defeat a constitutional amendment that, they feared, would mean not just federal control of child labor, but also would be the opening wedge for federal invasion of individual and parental rights, that would threaten parochial schools. Many church leaders had also opposed woman suffrage. When it passed in 1920 they called upon Catholic women to start voting. Most of the Catholic women actually started to vote in 1928, when there was a Catholic on the presidential ticket.

==== Polish Catholic parish schools ====
Polish Americans boosted membership in the Catholic church and expanded parishes previously non-existent in the Midwestern United States. Student enrollment had increased significantly in the interwar period and many young Polish women were requested to teach in the schools. Polish-born nuns were strongly desired for educating the students. A study in 1932 found that close to 300,000 Polish Americans were enrolled in over 600 Polish grade schools in the United States. Very few of the Polish Americans who graduated from grade school at the time pursued high school or college at that time. High School was not required and enrollment across the United States was far lower at the time.

Polish Americans took to the Catholic private schools in great numbers. In Chicago, 35,862 students (60 percent of the Polish population) attended Polish parochial schools in 1920. Nearly every Polish parish in the American Catholic Church had a school, whereas in Italian parishes, it was typically one in ten parishes. Even as late as 1960, estimates of Chicago's students attending Polish parochial schools was about 60% of the Polish American population.

==== Supreme Court upholds parochial schools ====
In 1922, the voters of Oregon passed an initiative amending Oregon Law Section 5259, the Compulsory Education Act. The law unofficially became known as the Oregon School Law. The citizens' initiative was primarily aimed at eliminating parochial schools, including Catholic schools. The law caused outraged Catholics to organize locally and nationally for the right to send their children to Catholic schools. In Pierce v. Society of Sisters (1925), the United States Supreme Court declared the Oregon's Compulsory Education Act unconstitutional in a ruling that has been called "the Magna Carta of the parochial school system."

==== Peak ====
By the mid-1960s, enrollment in Catholic parochial schools had reached an all-time high of 4.5 million elementary school pupils, with about 1 million students in Catholic high schools. The enrollments steadily declined as Catholics moved to the suburbs, where the children attended public schools.

=== Hospitals ===
As cities grew rapidly in the late 19th century, all major religious denominations built hospitals in urban areas. Catholics led the way for a large proportion of the patients were Catholic immigrants. In 1915, the Catholic religious orders for women operated 541 hospitals. They were open to patients regardless of religion. Costs were minimized by relying heavily on the work of women students who paid tuition and nuns who had taken a vow of poverty.

In 1945, there were 685 Catholic hospitals with a bed capacity of 87,000. Fifteen years later, there were 800 hospitals with 137,000 beds. Between 1960 and 1970, the number of patients nearly doubled. By 2000, however, mergers reduced the number of smaller hospitals, while patient admissions continued to grow rapidly, with heavy federal funding from Medicare and Medicaid.

In the late 20th century the hospitals increasingly closed their training programs and relied on paid graduate nurses who had college degrees in nursing. In the 21st century, as the cohorts of nuns aged, they turned their hospitals over to lay boards thus allowing the last generation of sister administrators to retire.

== Mid-20th century ==
=== Catholic Worker Movement ===
The Catholic Worker movement began as a means to combine Dorothy Day's history in American social activism, anarchism, and pacifism with the tenets of Catholicism (including a strong current of distributism), five years after her 1927 conversion. The group started with the Catholic Worker magazine that staked out a neutral, pacifist position in the war-torn 1930s. This grew into a "house of hospitality" in the slums of New York City and then a series of farms for people to live together communally. The movement quickly spread to other cities in the United States, and to Canada and Britain.

=== 1930s ===
Historian John McGreevey notes: "Priests across the country in the 1930s encouraged their parishioners to join unions, and some like Pittsburgh's Charles Rice, Detroit's Frederick Siedenberg, and Buffalo's Monsignor John P.Boland, served on regional labor boards and played key roles in workplace negotiations." The Catholic Worker Movement and Dorothy Day grew out of the same impetuses to put Catholic social teaching into action.

==== Catholic Conference on Industrial Problems ====
The Catholic Conference on Industrial Problems (1923–1937) was conceived by Fr. Raymond McGowan as a way of bringing together Catholic leaders in the fields of theology, labor, and business, with a view to promoting awareness and discussion of Catholic social teaching. Its first meeting was held in Milwaukee. While it was the venue for important discussions during its existence, its demise was due in part to lack of participation by business executives who perceived the dominant tone of the group as anti-business.

=== 1960s ===
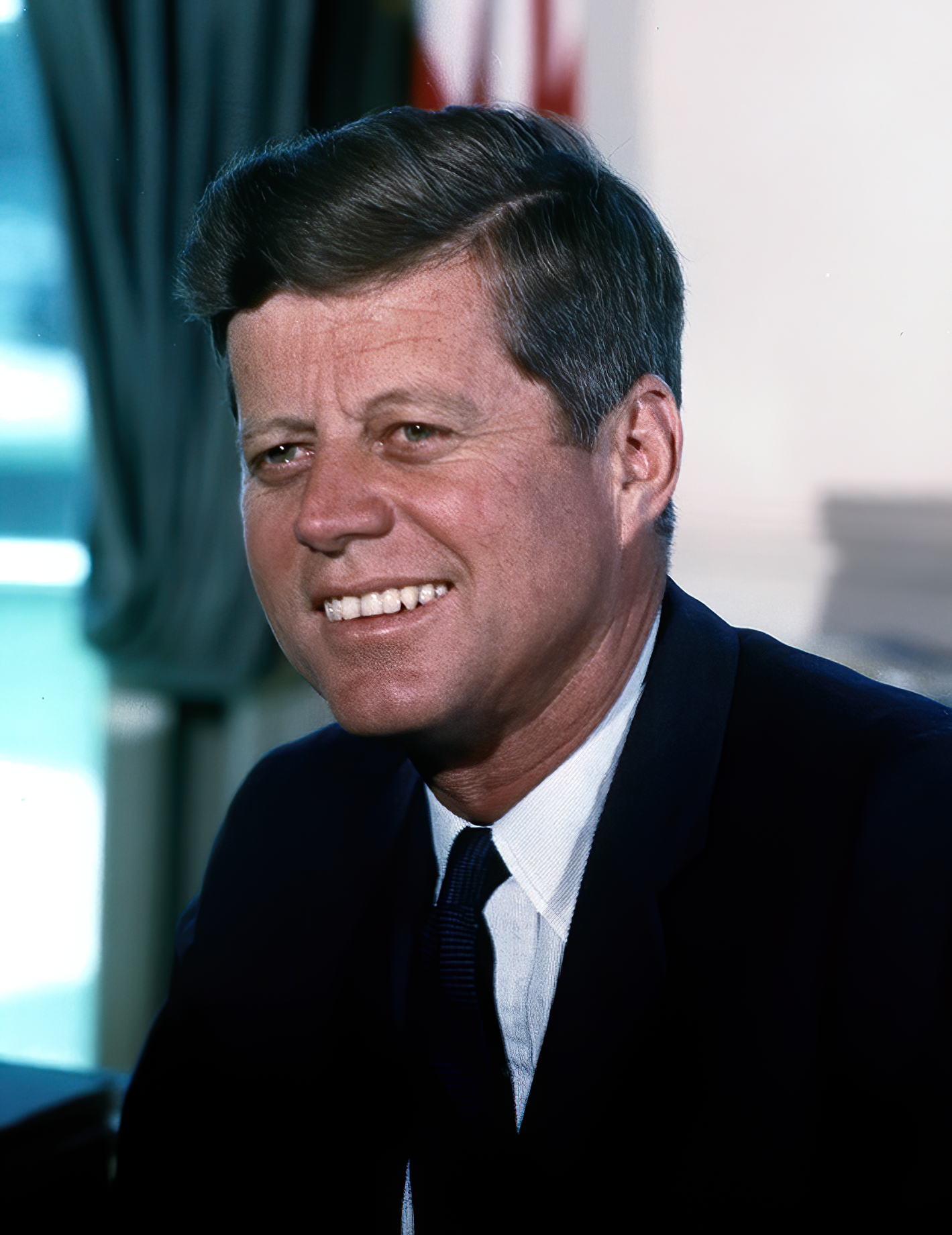
John F. Kennedy, 35th President of the United States

The 1960s marked a profound transformation of the Catholic Church in the United States.

Religion became a divisive issue during the presidential campaign of 1960. Senator John F. Kennedy of Massachusetts was vying to become the nation's first Catholic president, Using his base of support among urban Catholics. A key factor that was hurting Kennedy in his campaign was the widespread prejudice against his Roman Catholic religion; some Protestants believed that, if he were elected president, Kennedy would have to take orders from the pope in Rome. When offered the opportunity to speak before a convention of Baptist ministers, decided to try to put the issue to rest.

To address fears that his Roman Catholicism would impact his decision-making, John F. Kennedy famously told the Greater Houston Ministerial Association on September 12, 1960, "I am not the Catholic candidate for President. I am the Democratic Party's candidate for President who also happens to be a Catholic. I do not speak for my Church on public matters — and the Church does not speak for me." He promised to respect the separation of church and state and not to allow Catholic officials to dictate public policy to him. Kennedy also raised the question of whether one-quarter of Americans were relegated to second-class citizenship just because they were Roman Catholic.

Even so, it was widely believed after the election that Kennedy lost some heavily Protestant states because of his Catholicism. His address did not please everyone: many non-Catholics remained unconvinced that a Catholic could be president without divided loyalties; and many Catholics thought he conceded too much in his profession of belief in an "absolute" separation of church and state. The speech is widely considered to be an important marker in the history of Catholicism (and anti-Catholicism) in the United States.

Kennedy went on to win the national popular vote over Richard Nixon by just one tenth of one percentage point (0.1%) - the closest popular-vote margin of the 20th century. In the electoral college, Kennedy's victory was larger, as he took 303 electoral votes to Nixon's 219 (269 were needed to win). The New York Times, summarizing the discussion late in November, spoke of a "narrow consensus" among the experts that Kennedy had won more than he lost as a result of his Catholicism, as Northern Catholics flocked to Kennedy because of attacks on his religion.

=== 1970s ===
On January 22, 1973, the Supreme Court of the United States announced its decision in the Roe v. Wade case, finding that a constitutional right to privacy prohibited interference with a woman's 'right' to an abortion. The Catholic Church was one of the few institutional voices opposing the decision at the time, leading to the abortion issue being construed then and since largely as a religious one. Although a majority of Catholics have agreed with the hierarchy in their insistence on legal protection of the unborn, some—including prominent politicians—have not, leading to perennial controversies concerning the responsibilities of Catholics in American public life.

== Late 20th century ==
=== 1980s ===
Sanctuary of refugees from Central American civil wars was a movement in the 1980s. It was part of a broader anti-war movement positioned against U.S. foreign policy in Central America. By 1987, 440 sites in the United States had been declared "sanctuary congregations" or "sanctuary cities" open to migrants from the civil wars in El Salvador and Guatemala. These sites included university campuses.

The movement originated along the U.S. border with Mexico in Arizona but was also strong in Chicago, Philadelphia, and California. In 1981, Rev. John Fife and Jim Corbett, among others, began bringing Central American refugees into the United States. It was their intent to offer sanctuary, or faith-based protection, from the political violence that was taking place in El Salvador and Guatemala. The Department of Justice indicted several activists in south Texas for assisting refugees. Later 16 activists in Arizona were indicted, including Fife and Corbett in 1985; 11 were brought to trial and 8 were convicted of alien smuggling and other charges. The defendants claimed their actions were justifiable to save lives of people who would be killed and had no other way to escape.

This movement has been succeeded in the 2000s by the movement of churches and other houses of worship, to shelter immigrants in danger of deportation. The New Sanctuary Movement is a network of houses of worship that facilitates this effort.

=== Sex abuse cases in the later 20th century ===
In the later 20th century "[...] the Catholic Church in the United States became the subject of controversy due to clerical child abuse of children and adolescents, of episcopal negligence in arresting these crimes, and of numerous civil suits that cost Catholic dioceses hundreds of millions of dollars in damages." Although evidence of such abuse was uncovered in other countries, the vast majority of sex abuse cases occurred in the United States.

One estimate suggested that up to 3% of U.S. priests were involved. The United States Conference of Catholic Bishops commissioned a comprehensive study that found that four percent of all priests who served in the US from 1950 to 2002 faced some sort of sexual accusation.

Some priests resigned, others were defrocked and jailed, and there were financial settlements with many victims. The Church was widely criticized when it emerged that some bishops had known about abuse, and reassigned accused priests after first sending them to psychiatric counseling. Some bishops and psychiatrists contended that the prevailing psychology of the times suggested that people could be cured of such behavior through counseling. Pope John Paul II responded by declaring that "there is no place in the priesthood and religious life for those who would harm the young".

Major lawsuits emerged in 2001 and subsequent years claiming some priests had sexually abused minors. The prosecutions of priests sexually abusing children were widely reported in the news media. Some commentators, such as journalist Jon Dougherty, have argued that media coverage of the issue has been excessive, given that the same problems plague other institutions, such as the US public school system, with much greater frequency.

== Black Catholics ==
Held in bondage in the United States until 1867 and under Jim Crow throughout most of the 20th century, Black Catholics in America began a large-scale revolt in the late 1960s, beginning with the statement from the National Black Catholic Clergy Caucus in 1968. The movement that followed helped develop and shape modern Black Catholicism.

Roughly until the mid-1990s, Black Catholicism transformed itself from its pre-Vatican II roots into a fully-fledged member of the Black Church, complete with its own structure, identity, music, liturgy, thought, theology, and appearance within the larger Catholic Church. This would result in the Black Catholic Church traditions seen today in most Black parishes, institutions, schools, and organizations.

== See also ==
- Catholic Church in the United States
- Catholic schools in the United States
- History of the Catholic Church in the United States
- 19th century history of the Catholic Church in the United States
