= BlackPAC =

American political action committee focused on Black voter mobilization

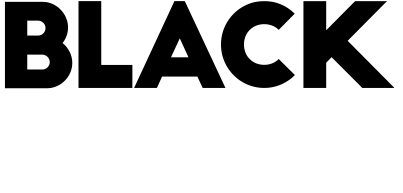
- Formation: 2016
- Founder: Adrianne Shropshire
- Type: Super PAC (independent expenditure-only political committee)
- Headquarters: Washington, D.C., U.S.
- Executive director: Adrianne Shropshire
- Website: blackpac.com

BlackPAC is an American Super PAC focused on mobilizing and engaging African American voters. It registered with the Federal Election Commission (FEC) in 2016. Reuters has described BlackPAC as left-leaning and reported that it planned to spend $30 million on Black voter outreach efforts in battleground states during the 2024 U.S. presidential election cycle.

BlackPAC has worked to turn out Black voters in prominent elections in the United States, including the 2017 United States Senate special election in Alabama and the 2017 Virginia gubernatorial election.

== Affiliated organization ==
In 2018, The Washington Post described the Black Progressive Action Coalition (BPAC) as an affiliated 501(c)(4) organization that works alongside BlackPAC on voter engagement and issue advocacy.

== Funding and criticism ==
In 2018, the Center for Public Integrity reported that BlackPAC raised millions for voter mobilization and described its funding as coming largely from other political committees and nonprofit organizations that do not publicly disclose their donors; the report also quoted campaign-finance watchdogs criticizing the arrangement as a conduit for "dark money".
