= Carol Keehan =

Carol Keehan DC
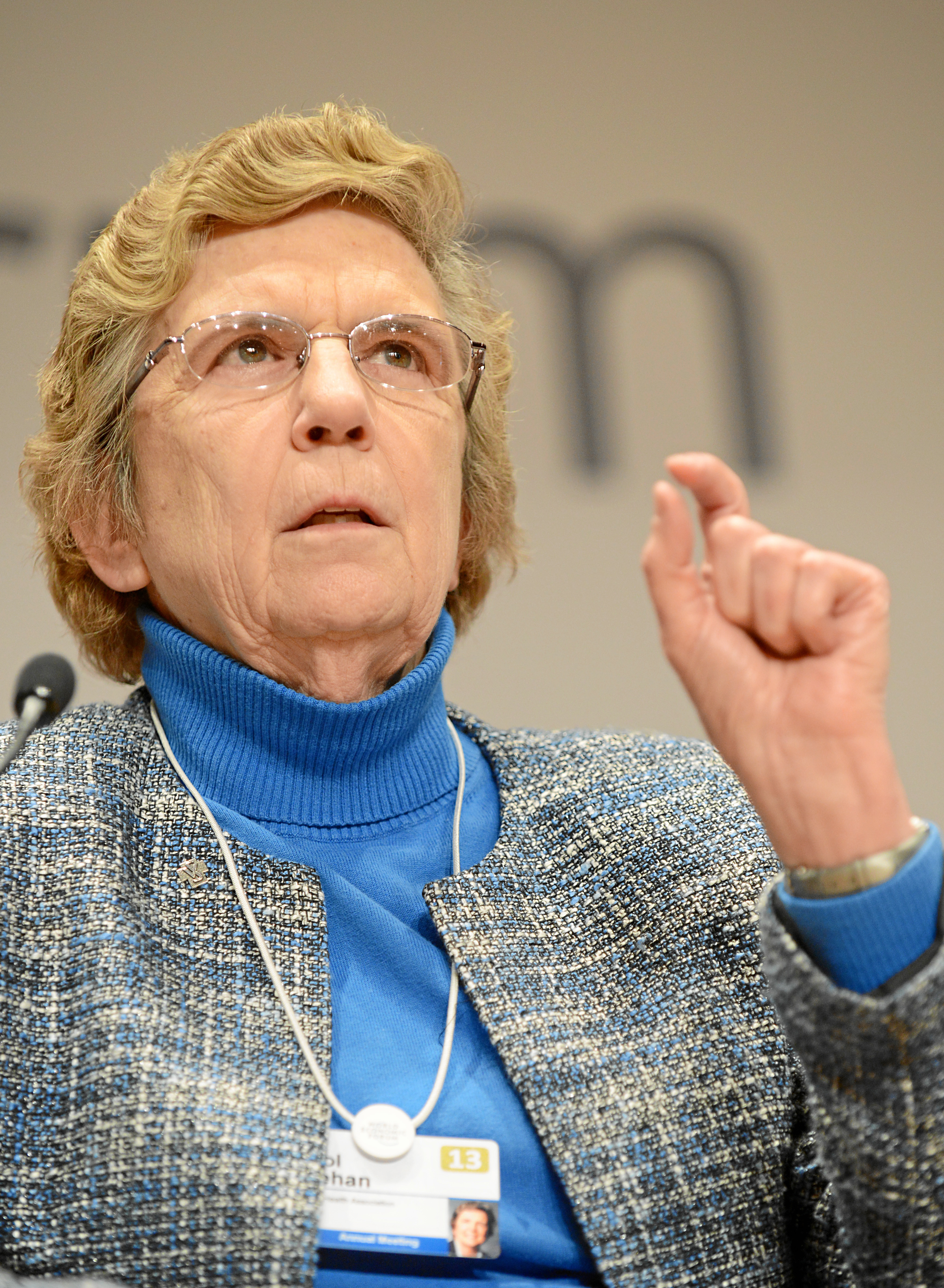
- Carol Keehan at the World Economic Forum Annual Meeting in 2013
- Education: St. Joseph's College; University of South Carolina
- Occupation: CEO
- Employer: Catholic Health Association of the United States

Carol Keehan is a religious sister of the Daughters of Charity of Saint Vincent de Paul. She served as president and CEO of the Catholic Health Association of the United States (CHA) from 2005 to 2019.

== Biography ==
From 2005 to 2019, Keenan served as the ninth president and CEO of CHA, overseeing all activities of the organization. There are 620 hospitals affiliated with CHA.

She was awarded the Pro Ecclesia et Pontifice by Pope Benedict XVI. For her dedication to "carrying on the healing ministry of Jesus Christ" she was named one of Time magazine's 100 Most Influential People in the World for 2010.

She is a member of the board of trustees at St. John's University in New York.
