= Chris Korge =

American lawyer

Finance Chair of the Democratic National Committee
- Incumbent
- Assumed office May 2019
- Chair: Tom Perez; Jaime Harrison; Ken Martin
- Preceded by: Henry R. Muñoz III

Personal details
- Born: Christopher G. Korge
- Party: Democratic
- Education: Miami Dade College (AA); Temple University (JD)

Christopher G. "Chris" Korge is an American attorney, political fundraiser, lobbyist and real estate developer serving as the finance chair of the Democratic National Committee.

== Education ==
Korge earned an associate degree from Miami Dade College and a Juris Doctor from the Temple University Beasley School of Law.

== Career ==
Korge began his legal career in 1981 working for the cities of Miami Beach and Miami, FL. Korge served as the Assistant City Attorney in Miami Beach from 1983 to 1987, which coincided with his first cousin, Alex Daoud's terms as Mayor of Miami Beach. During this time Korge was involved in various legal matters for the city, including issues related to zoning, contracts, and municipal law.

Korge is mentioned several times in the former Mayor's book, Sins of South Beach: The True Story of Corruption, Violence, Murder and the Making of Miami Beach. In his book Daoud recounts two particular incidents where Korge offered him bribes in exchange for favorable votes in relation to real estate development projects under review by the Miami Beach City Council.

Daoud was later indicted (1991) and convicted (1992) on federal bribery charges and served 17 months in federal prison. Daoud testified against many of the South Florida players who had paid him bribes during his terms as Mayor. Korge was never charged for any of the bribes alleged in Daoud's book.

Prior to his role in DNC leadership, Korge was a Democratic Party bundler. Korge was a major fundraiser and National Co-Finance Chair for the Al Gore 2000 presidential campaign, Hillary Clinton 2008 presidential campaign, and Barack Obama 2012 presidential campaign. He was also a prominent fundraiser for Alex Penelas.

Korge became finance director of the Democratic National Committee in May 2019, succeeding Henry R. Muñoz III.
