= 19th-century history of the Catholic Church in the United States =

In 1800 the Catholics were a small minority everywhere except Maryland. Immigration from Ireland and Germany gave them millions of adherents from the 1840s to the 1880s. Then came millions more from Italy, Poland and Eastern Europe, as well as French Canada. Large numbers of priests and nuns came from Ireland and France. The Irish soon dominated the clergy church, with a great majority of bishops by 1900. As the immigrants arrived new parishes and diocese were created. Rebuffed in efforts to obtain government funds for schools, the Catholics set up a parochial school system largely staffed with nuns. It reached about a third of the children. They also set up colleges. There were few Catholics in the South, apart from Louisiana. However they were well represented in the nation's cities, mill towns and mining centers. Anti-Catholic politics flared briefly in the 1850s, but the Catholic voters surged into the Democratic Party and Irish Catholic politicians played increasingly dominant roles in Democratic machines in Boston, New York, and other major cities. Devotional practices included daily rosary prayers, regular attendance at Sunday Mass, and special roles for devotion to the Blessed Virgin Mary and favorite saints.

== Immigration ==
During the 19th century, a wave of immigrants from Ireland, Germany, Italy, Eastern Europe, and elsewhere swelled the number of Roman Catholics. Substantial numbers of Catholics also came from French Canada during the mid-19th century and settled in New England. This influx would eventually bring increased political power for the Roman Catholic Church and a greater cultural presence, led at the same time to a growing fear of the Catholic "menace."

Between 1820 and 1860, the Irish constituted over one third of all immigrants to the United States. In the 1840s, they comprised nearly half of all immigrants to this nation. American Catholics were not exactly happy to see the new immigrants. Not only did the exponential growth set off nativist alarms among Protestants, they presented problems for the existing Catholic parishes. The wave of immigration from Ireland led to tension between the Irish and the French-dominated American Catholic Church. French Catholics were contemptuous of the Irish.

Later this dynamic would be repeated in the post-Civil War period with the Irish in positions of power, and the new immigrants coming from places such as Naples and Sicily. These new immigrants shared little in common with their Irish Catholic co-religionists other than their faith.

Many Catholics stopped practicing their religion or became Protestants. However, there were about 700,000 converts to Catholicism from 1813 to 1893.

== Archdiocese of Baltimore ==
Maryland was originally settled by English Catholics. Thus the diocese of Baltimore achieved a pre-eminence over the other dioceses in the U.S. Under Bishop John Carroll it was established as a diocese on November 6, 1789, and was established an Archdiocese on April 8, 1808.

In 1858, the Sacred Congregation of the Propaganda, with the approval of Pius IX "Prerogative of Place" was conferred on the Archdiocese of Baltimore. This decree gave the Archbishop of Baltimore precedence over all the Archbishops of the United States (but not Cardinals) in councils, gatherings, and meetings of whatever kind of the Hierarchy (in conciliis, coetibus et comitiis quibuscumque) regardless of the seniority of other Archbishops in promotion or ordination.

Baltimore became the host for eleven councils where American bishops met to coordinate their work.

== Catholic revival ==
Historian John McGreevy identifies a major Catholic revival that swept across Europe, North America and South America in the early 19th century. Historians call it “Ultramontanism.” shorthand for a cluster of shifts that included a Vatican-fostered move to Thomistic philosophy. This was nurtured in the world of Catholic parishes, schools, and associations, whose members understood themselves as arrayed against, and morally superior to the wider American society. For parishioners it meant a much deeper piety that emphasized miracles, saints, and new devotions such as, compulsory Sunday attendance, regular confession and communion, praying the rosary a devotion to the Blessed Virgin, and meatless Fridays. There was a deeper respect for bishops, and especially the Pope, with more direct control by the Vatican over selecting bishops and less autonomy for local parishes. There was a sharp increase in Mass attendance, religious vocations soared, especially among women. Across urban America Catholics set up a parochial school system using the newly available nuns, and funding from the more religious parents. Intermarriage with Protestants was strongly discouraged, and only tolerated if the children were brought up Catholics. The parochial schools effectively promoted marriage inside the faith. By the late 19th century dioceses were building foreign language elementary schools for Germans and other language groups, but raising large sums to build English-only diocesan high schools, which had the effect of increasing ethnic intermarriage and diluting ethnic nationalism. Leadership was increasingly in the hands of the Irish, whose leaders worked closely with the Vatican and in turn promoted Vatican supremacy that culminated in Papal infallibility proclaimed in 1870.

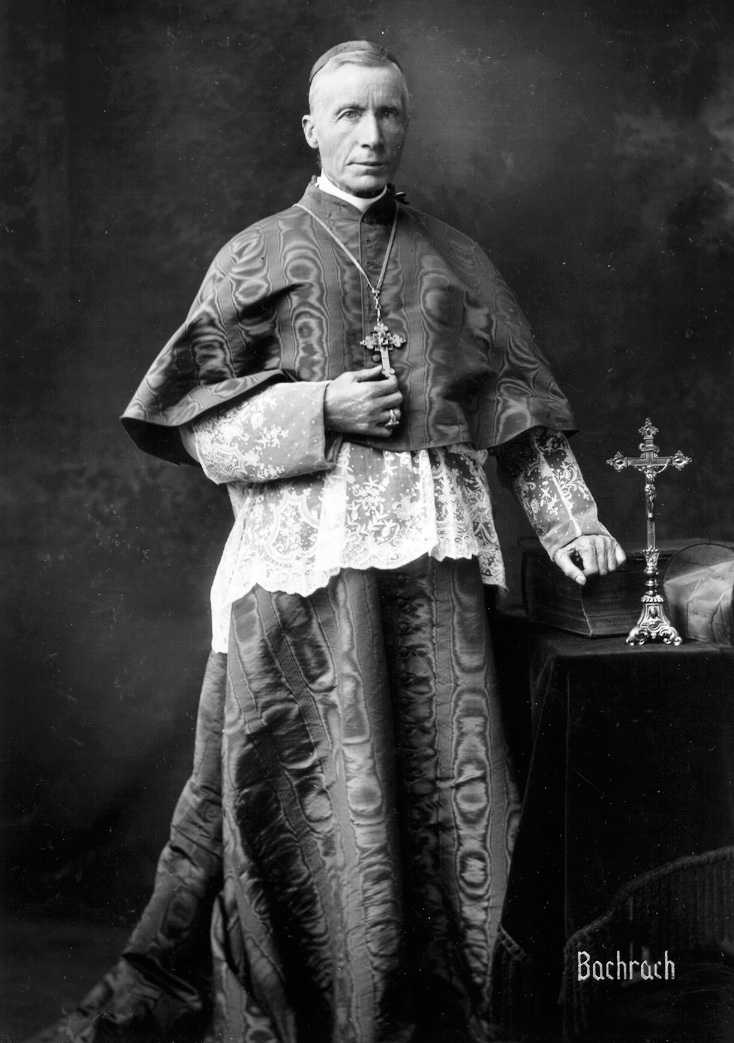
James Gibbons (1834–1921), cardinal archbishop of Baltimore, was the widely respected leader of American Catholics

Beginning in the 1840s, although outnumbered by the German American Catholics, Irish American Catholics comprised most of the bishops and controlled most of the Catholic colleges and seminaries in the United States.

== Parochial schools: the funding issue ==
In 1840-1842 Bishop John Hughes in New York City led a political battle to secure funding for the Catholic schools. He rallied support from both the Tammany Hall Democrats, and from the opposition Whig Party, whose leaders, especially Governor William H. Seward, supported Hughes. He argued Catholics paid double for schools—they paid taxes to subsidize private schools they could not use and also paid for the parochial schools they did use. Catholics could not use Public School Society schools because they forced students to listen to readings from the Protestant King James Bible which were designed to undermine their Catholic faith. With the Maclay Act in 1842, the New York State legislature established the New York City Board of Education. It gave the city an elective Board of Education empowered to build and supervise schools and distribute the education fund. It provided that no money should go to the schools that taught religion, so Hughes lost his battle. He turned inward: he founded an independent Catholic school system in the city. His new system included the first Catholic college in the Northeast, St. John's College, now Fordham University. By 1870, 19 percent of the city's children were attending Catholic schools.

In other cities as well Catholic parochial schools began as a reaction against a growing publicly funded school system that was essentially Protestant. In 1839 and 1840, the American Bible Society pledged that "the Bible would be read in every classroom in the nation". In what was then a predominantly Protestant country, this was generally understood to be the King James Version of the Scriptures.

In 1875, Republican President Ulysses S. Grant called for a Constitutional amendment that would mandate free public schools and prohibit the use of public funds for "sectarian" schools. Grant's motivation was rooted in his fear of a future with "patriotism and intelligence on one side and superstition, ambition and greed on the other" which he identified with the Catholic Church. Grant called for public schools that would be "unmixed with atheistic, pagan or sectarian teaching."

Republican Senator James G. Blaine of Maine had proposed such an amendment to the Constitution in 1874. The amendment was defeated in 1875 but would be used as a model for so-called "Blaine Amendments" incorporated into 34 state constitutions over the next three decades. These amendments prohibited the use of public funds to fund parochial schools and are still in effect today although a 2002 Supreme Court ruling partially vitiated these amendments. As of March 2009, no state school system had changed its laws to allow state funds to be used for this purpose.

== Plenary Councils of Baltimore ==
In the latter half of the 19th century, the first attempt at standardizing discipline in the American Church occurred with the convocation of the Plenary Councils of Baltimore.

== Slavery debate ==
Two slaveholding states, Maryland and Louisiana, had large contingents of Catholic residents. Archbishop of Baltimore, John Carroll, had two black servants - one free and one a slave. The Society of Jesus owned a large number of slaves who worked on the community's farms. Realizing that their properties were more profitable if rented out to tenant farmers rather that worked by slaves, the Jesuits began selling off their slaves in 1837.

In 1839, Pope Gregory XVI issued a Bull, entitled In Supremo. Its main focus was against slave trading, but it also clearly condemned racial slavery:

We, by apostolic authority, warn and strongly exhort in the Lord faithful Christians of every condition that no one in the future dare bother unjustly, despoil of their possessions, or reduce to slavery Indians, Blacks or other such peoples.

However, the American church continued in deeds, if not in public discourse, to support slaveholding interests. Some American bishops misinterpreted In Supremo as condemning only the slave trade and not slavery itself. Bishop John England of Charleston actually wrote several letters to the Secretary of State under President Van Buren explaining that the Pope, in In Supremo, did not condemn slavery but only the slave trade.

One outspoken critic of slavery was Archbishop John Baptist Purcell of Cincinnati, Ohio. In an 1863 Catholic Telegraph editorial Purcell wrote:

"When the slave power predominates, religion is nominal. There is no life in it. It is the hard-working laboring man who builds the church, the school house, the orphan asylum, not the slaveholder, as a general rule. Religion flourishes in a slave state only in proportion to its intimacy with a free state, or as it is adjacent to it."

During the war, American bishops continued to allow slave-owners to take communion. During the Civil War, the American hierarchy was so fearful of local schisms that the bishops were reluctant to speak out on behalf of abolition.

== African-American Catholics ==
Because the antebellum South was predominantly Protestant, most African-Americans who adopted Christianity became Protestant. However, there have been African-American Catholics since colonial times. Irish, Italian and Eastern European Catholics and their clergy often excluded blacks from local parishes. Many blacks simply felt more at home in their birthright Protestant churches, where adaptable liturgies and ministerial opportunities meant that black Christians could worship their own way more readily than in Latin-rite Catholicism.

Opposition to educating the slaves in the South was so intense that many religious orders shied away from the task for fear of alienating white patronage. Feuds between religious orders and non-Catholics often forced black Americans out of the schools. Southern bishops repeatedly tried to muster the funds and workforce and funds to render an effective ministry to African Americans, but their extreme poverty crippled most of the efforts they made.

As a result of this discrimination, African-American Catholics operated largely as segregated enclaves. They also founded separate religious orders for black nuns and priests since diocesan seminaries would not accept them. For example, they formed two separate communities of black nuns: the Oblate Sisters of Providence in 1829 and the Holy Family Sisters in 1842.

While there had been African-American Catholics since colonial times, historically only white priests tended to their spiritual and corporal needs. Although the Vatican promoted the importance of African-American priests, the American hierarchy, exhibiting commonly accepted racial attitudes, considered African-Americans poor prospects for the priesthood.

These attitudes forced the first African-American priests to pursue their formational studies and ordination outside of the United States. James Augustine Healy, a light-skinned son of an African-American mother and Irish-immigrant father, was ordained in 1854 in Paris, France. Father Healy eventually became the second bishop of the Diocese of Portland, Maine in 1875—the first such African American. His brother, Patrick Francis Healy, joined the Society of Jesus (Jesuits) in Liege, France in 1864 and became the president of Georgetown University ten years later. These were all firsts for African Americans, and he was also the first to earn a PhD.

In 1886, Augustus Tolton, a former slave, was ordained a priest in Rome and returned to the United States to minister to the needs of African-American Catholics in the Midwest. It was not until 1891 that Charles Uncles became the first African-American priest to be ordained in the United States.

In 1866, Archbishop Martin J. Spalding of Baltimore convened the Second Plenary Council of Baltimore, partially in response to the growing need for religious care for former slaves. Attending bishops remain divided over the issue of separate parishes for African-American Catholics.

In 1889, Daniel Rudd, a former slave and Ohio journalist, organized the National Black Catholic Congress, the first national organization for African-American Catholic lay men. The Congress met in Washington, D.C. and discussed issues such as education, job training, and "the need for family virtues."

== Third Plenary Council of Baltimore ==
One result of the Third Plenary Council of Baltimore was the development of the Baltimore Catechism which became the standard text for Catholic education in the United States and remained so until the 1960s when Catholic churches and schools began moving away from catechism-based education.

Another result of this council was the establishment of The Catholic University of America, the national Catholic university in the United States.

== Labor union movement ==
The Catholic Church exercised a prominent role in shaping America's labor movement. From the onset of significant immigration in the 1840s, the Church in the United States was predominantly urban, with both its leaders and congregants usually of the laboring classes. Over the course of the second half of the 19th century, nativism, anti-Catholicism, and anti-unionism coalesced in Republican politics, and Catholics gravitated toward unions and the Democratic Party.

== Americanism ==
The Whitemarsh Constitutions in 1784 called for congregational election of pastors and lay control of parochial finances. Bishop John England in Charleston set up a Diocesan Constitution calling for popularly elected delegates in the dioceses. By the 1830s, however, the bishops had regained full control and ended advisory councils of laymen. Progressive Catholics in America advocated greater Catholic involvement in American culture, which some understood to mean that Roman Catholics should adapt its teachings to modern civilization.

This was too close to the liberalism condemned by the pope. Rumors spread among Europeans that an "Americanist" movement was sweeping the Catholic churches in the United States and would allegedly soon lead to the American Church claiming independence for itself. Americanism was considered a serious heresy by the Vatican, meant Catholic endorsement of the policy of separation of church and state. Rome feared that such a heresy was held by Irish Catholic leaders in the United States, such as Isaac Hecker, and bishops John Keane, John Ireland, and John Lancaster Spalding, as well as the magazines Catholic World and Ave Marie. The true Catholic belief supposedly was close support of the Catholic Church by a government. Allegations were made by German American Catholic bishops in the Midwest, who are distrustful of the Irish to increasingly dominated the American Catholic Church..

The Vatican grew alarmed in the 1890s, and Pope Leo XIII issued an encyclical denouncing Americanism in theory. In Longinqua oceani (1895; “Wide Expanse of the Ocean”), Leo warned the American church leaders hierarchy not to export their unique system of separation of church and state. In 1898 he lamented an America where church and state are "dissevered and divorced," and wrote of his preference for a closer relationship between the Catholic Church and the State, along European lines. Finally, in his pastoral letter Testem benevolentiae (1899; “Witness to Our Benevolence”) to Cardinal Gibbons, Leo condemned other forms of Americanism. In response, Gibbons denied that American Catholics held any of the condemned views. Leo's pronouncements effectively ended the Americanist movement and curtailed the activities of American progressive Catholics.

The controversy soon died out, but the Irish Catholics increasingly demonstrated their total loyalty to the Pope, and traces of liberal thought in the Catholic colleges were suppressed. At bottom it was a cultural conflict, as the conservative Europeans were facing heavy attacks on the Catholic church from the new German empire and the French Third Republic. Accordingly, European Church leaders did not appreciate arguments put forward by Archbishop Ireland that a self-confident, optimistic American republic—with no established church—was the best forum for the growth of Roman Catholicism.

== Anti-Catholicism ==
Some anti-immigrant and Nativism movements, like the Know Nothings in the 1850s and the Ku Klux Klan in the 1920s, have also been anti-Catholic.

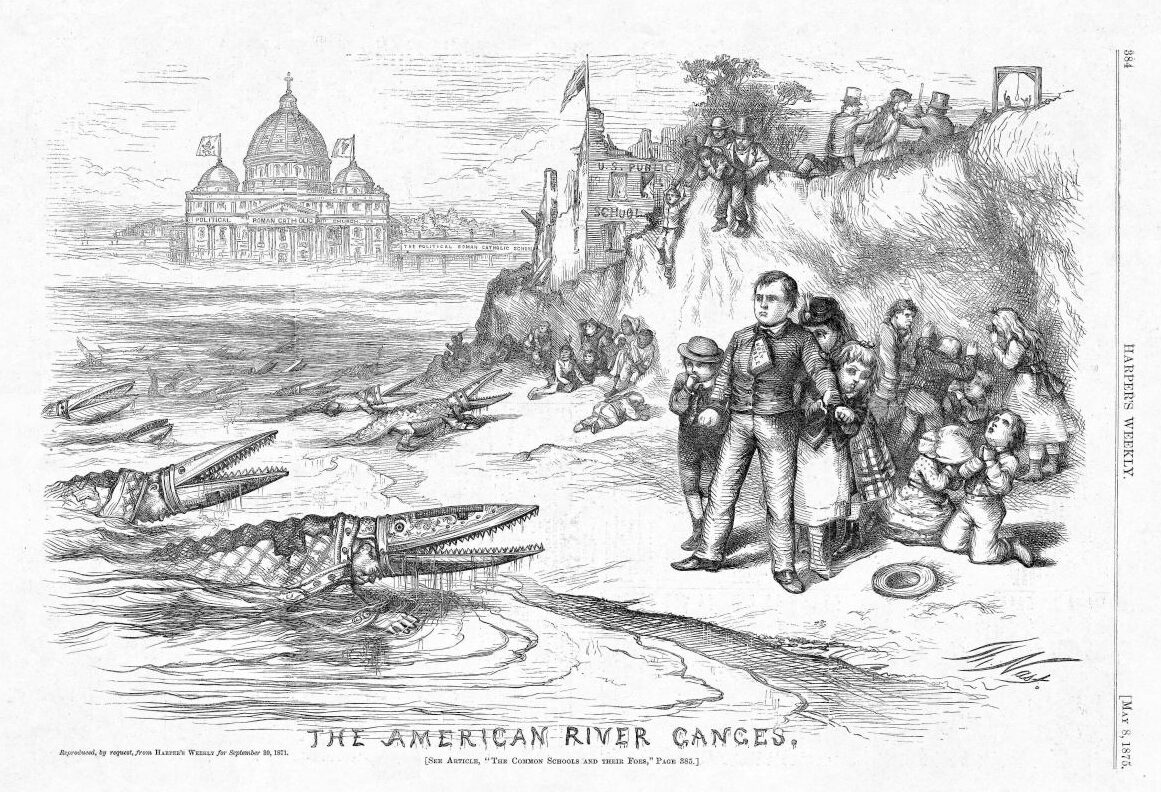
Famous 1876 editorial cartoon by Thomas Nast showing bishops as crocodiles attacking public schools, with the connivance of Irish Catholic politicians

Anti-Catholic animus in the United States reached a peak in the 1850s when some Protestant leaders became alarmed by the influx of Catholic immigrants. Preachers echoed the Protestant Reformation of 400 years before by calling the Catholic Church the Whore of Babylon in the Book of Revelation.

Irish Catholic politicians were blamed for engaging in political corruption and violence. Nativists alleged that the Irish voters were controlled by local priests who were in the control of Rome.

The nativist movement found expression in a short-lived national political movement called the Know-Nothing Party of the 1850s, which (unsuccessfully) ran former president Millard Fillmore as its presidential candidate in 1856. Catholic patriotism manifested by service in the Civil War undermined the movement. After the war anti-Catholic agitation, as in the American Protective Association of the 1890s received almost no support from major politicians or cultural leaders, and was in large part the product of Lutheran or Irish Protestant immigrants, especially those who brought in Orange Lodges from Canada.

The Catholic Church, in part, established lay fraternities and colleges such as Boston College, the College of Holy Cross, and the University of Notre Dame to upgrade its cultural status.

== See also ==
- History of the Catholic Church in the United States
- 20th-century history of the Catholic Church in the United States
- History of Catholic education in the United States
