= Henry R. Muñoz III =

American activist (born 1959)

Vice Chair of the Democratic National Committee
- In office 2022 – February 1, 2025

Finance Chair Emeritus and Honorary Director of the Democratic National Committee
- Incumbent
- Assumed office May 5, 2019

Finance Chair of the Democratic National Committee
- In office January 2013 – May 5, 2019
- Succeeded by: Chris Korge

Personal details
- Born: Henry Ruben Muñoz III; December 1959 (age 66) San Antonio, Texas, U.S.
- Party: Democratic
- Education: Loyola University New Orleans (BA)

Henry R. Muñoz III (born December 1959) is an American businessperson and activist. He has used his wealth to launch national movements including Momento Latino, TheDream.US and Latino Victory to support the Latino community through awareness, college funding and electoral support. He was a vice chair of the Democratic National Committee.

He is the cofounder of SOMOS US, a healthcare network in NYC treating largely immigrant communities that has been at the forefront of battling the COVID-19 pandemic. He is the former chairman of the Board & CEO of Muñoz & Company, one of the largest and oldest minority-owned design practices in the country. Under his leadership, Muñoz & Company pioneered an approach to architecture, urban planning, and design that acknowledges the imprint of the Latino community upon the built environment of the United States. He helped found the effort to create a Latino Museum on the Mall in Washington D.C., as chairman of the commission to study the viability of the creation of the National Museum of the American Latino.

He was appointed as DNC Finance Chair by President Barack Obama in January 2013. He was re-elected unanimously by the DNC for his second term in 2017. He was the longest serving Finance Chair in DNC History. He is now Finance Chair emeritus of the Democratic National Committee, the first Latino and openly gay man to ever hold that position.

Muñoz bought the comedy studio Funny or Die in May 2021.

== Early life and education ==
Muñoz was born in San Antonio, Texas, the son of Henry "The Fox" Muñoz, Jr., a Latino farm labor leader and immigrants rights advocate. Muñoz attended Loyola University in New Orleans.

== Career ==
=== SOMOS US ===
SOMOS is a non-profit, physician-led network of over 2,500 health care providers serving close to 700,000 Medicaid beneficiaries in New York City. Launched in 2015 by Chairman Dr. Ramon Tallaj, Henry Muñoz III, and cohorts of Latino, Asian, and Black doctors, SOMOS is the only physician-led performance provider system participating in the New York State's DSRIP Program.

=== Momento Latino ===
Founded in the early months of the COVID-19 pandemic, Momento Latino works to create meaningful, systemic change for the Latinx community in three key areas: Healthcare, Education, and the Economy. A growing coalition of over 140 members, Momento Latino understands that the Latinx community is core to the cultural fabric and economic engine of the United States. The Momento Latino seeks to push for change and elevate issues important to Latinx community.

In October 2020 Momento Latino aired a nationally televised special on CBS titled "Essential Heroes: A Momento Latino Event" in a star-studded event celebrating the resilience of the Latinx community during the COVID-19 pandemic.

=== Funny or Die ===
Muñoz bought the popular comedy platform Funny or Die for an undisclosed amount. The acquisition was announced in Variety on May 12, 2021. Muñoz purchased Funny Or Die from the company's former stakeholders, which included AMC Networks, WarnerMedia and Sequoia Capital.

=== Cultural Productions ===
Munoz is the Founder & CEO of the Cultural Productions. Working in design, digital & traditional media, production, brand strategy and development, Cultural Productions has guided clients in healthcare, education, politics, and culturally-focused organizations on how they can best connect with the cultural frameworks of diverse communities and create business opportunities and strategic partnerships that expand their own business footprint.

=== Muñoz and Company ===
Becoming a part-owner of the Jones and Kell, Inc. architectural firm in 1993, Muñoz, not an architect, entered the field of architecture and design. The firm was renamed Kell Muñoz Wigodsky to reflect the three partners. In 2000, the firm was renamed Kell Muñoz Architects, Inc. after Dan Wigodsky left to start a private practice. In 2008, John Kell, Jr. retired and the firm became Muñoz and Company in 2013. Muñoz & Co has a widely diverse portfolio of projects including governmental, institutional, higher education, public education and corporate work. Their designers have been recognized with more than 143 juried design awards, and their work has been featured in The New York Times, Wall Street Journal and Architectural Digest, among others.

=== Smithsonian ===
Muñoz was active in the establishment of Museo Alameda—one of the first formal Smithsonian Affiliates—which closed its doors in 2012. For a number of year he has been involved with the Smithsonian Institution in Latino boards and also in the effort to create a National Latino Museum on the Mall in Washington D.C. He serves as chairman of the national commission established to study the creation of what would be known as The Smithsonian American Latino Museum. He is a former vice chairman of the Smithsonian National Board, chairman emeritus of the Smithsonian National Latino Board and serves as a trustee of Cooper-Hewitt, Smithsonian Design Museum.

=== National Parks Foundation ===
He was appointed to the board of the National Parks Foundation in March 2012. He helped to establish The American Latino Heritage Fund, to support the creation of national monuments and heritage sites to record the contributions of Latinos to the history of the United States.

=== TheDream.US ===
In 2013 he joined Amanda Bennett, Don Graham, Carlos Gutierrez, as founders of TheDream.US.

=== Latino Victory ===
In 2014, he joined forces with Eva Longoria to form The Latino Victory project whose mission is to build political power within the progressive Latino community to ensure the voices of Latinos are reflected at every level in government.

=== Democratic National Committee ===
He was the national finance chairman for the Democratic National Committee.

He is an alumnus of Loyola University New Orleans, serving on the board of trustees. In the aftermath of Hurricane Katrina, he and his colleagues contributed comprehensive design services to establish a new master plan for Loyola campuses.

== Recognition ==
- Hispanic Heritage Foundation Award for Leadership, September 2014.
- Hispanic Contractors Association of San Antonio, Architect/Designer of the Year 2018.
- United States Hispanic Chamber of Commerce, LGBTQ Advocate of the Year 2019.
- United States National Committee of the International Council on Monuments and Sites, World Heritage Celebration Award 2019.
- UnidosUS, Graciela Olivarez La Raza Award 2020.
- Leslie-Lohman Museum of Art, National Superstars Award 2020.
- 2022 NHMC Impact Awards: Washington D.C.
- Comic Relief US Visionary Award 2023.
