= John P. Boland (priest) =

American Roman Catholic priest

The Right Reverend Monsignor John P. Boland P.A. D.D.

Personal life
- Born: April 27, 1888 Buffalo, New York
- Died: July 30, 1968 (aged 80) Buffalo, New York
- Education: St. Bonaventure University
- Known for: labor rights activism

Religious life
- Religion: Roman Catholic
- Ordination: June 10, 1911

John P. Boland was an American Roman Catholic priest from Buffalo, New York involved in unionization and other social justice issues. He was involved in the foundation of the Buffalo Committee on Stabilization of Unemployment, and later became chairman of the New York State Labor Relations Board. After World War II, he was involved with the War Relief Service of the National Catholic Welfare Conference.

== Sources ==
- Notre Dame Archives
