= Catholic Health Association of the United States =

Catholic professional association

- Abbreviation: CHA
- Founded: 1915
- Purpose: Professional association
- Headquarters: St. Louis, Missouri
- President and CEO: Sr. Mary Haddad, RSM
- Board of Trustees Chair: Julie S. Manas
- Budget: $27 million (2018)
- Website: www.chausa.org

The Catholic Health Association of the United States (CHA), formerly the Catholic Hospital Association of the United States and Canada, is a Catholic professional association comprising more than 600 hospitals and 1,400 long-term care and other health facilities in the United States. The association has offices in Washington, D.C., and St. Louis, Missouri.

== Leadership ==
The association is led by Sr. Mary Haddad, a member of the Sisters of Mercy. She assumed the leadership role in 2019, succeeding Sister Carol Keehan, a member of the Daughters of Charity, who had assumed her duties as president and chief executive officer in 2005.

== Controversy ==
CHA created a controversy within the Catholic Church when it disagreed the United States Conference of Catholic Bishops and came out in support of Barack Obama's health care overhaul, the Patient Protection and Affordable Care Act. The USCCB believed the overhaul could provide for taxpayer funded abortion; the CHA said this was a "false claim". CHA was criticized for subverting the bishops' authority. At least one bishop, Thomas Joseph Tobin of the Diocese of Providence, withdrew his diocese's hospitals from membership in the CHA, saying, "Your enthusiastic support of the legislation, in contradiction of the bishops of the United States, provided an excuse for members of Congress, misled the public and caused a serious scandal for many members of the church" and said it was "embarrassing" to be associated with the CHA.

Cardinal Francis George, who was president of the USCCB at the time, reported that he and other bishops tried to reach out to Keehan both before and after the vote; he also said that in choosing Obama over the bishops, she had "weakened the moral voice of the bishops in the U.S."
