= Faith in Public Life =

Religious progressive advocacy organization

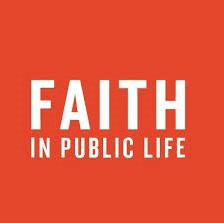
- Abbreviation: FPL
- Formation: 2008
- Founder: Jennifer Butler
- Headquarters: Washington, D.C.
- Website: Official website

Faith in Public Life (FPL) is a left-leaning non-profit founded by Christians that is focused on influencing state and federal government policies. Based in Washington, D.C., it was founded by Reverend Jennifer Butler and aims to influence policies relating to racial equality, immigration, healthcare, the economy, voting rights, women's equality, and LGBTQ rights.

FPL experienced an increase in popularity following the 2016 U.S. presidential election.

== History ==
Faith in Public Life originated in 2005 by the Center for American Progress (CAP), a progressive policy think tank. CAP's first president and CEO, John Podesta, spoke often about how his faith informs his politics, and worked with a little-known group, Res Publica, to draft a report on the future of the progressive faith movement. The report recommended an independent entity that would act on its own as well as coordinate efforts with other religious groups. It was envisioned as "a sort of organizational anchor for the Religious left, a strategy hub that would coordinate disparate groups and develop overarching media strategies for campaigns." CAP hired Jennifer Butler, an ordained minister in the Presbyterian Church (USA) and spun it off as an independent organization in 2008.

== Activities ==
In 2008 as the presidential election neared, FPL organized the Compassion Forum, an event where faith leaders asked candidates, such as then Senators Hillary Clinton and Barack Obama, questions about moral issues such as poverty, global AIDS, climate change and human rights. The event was hosted by author John Meacham and was broadcast live on CNN, giving moderate and progressive faith leaders a national platform.

In 2010 after Tea Party Town Halls in August drove down support for the Affordable Care Act, FPL and allies organized a health care for a call in with President Barack Obama and over 140,000 religious supporters of the bill. FPL organized faith leaders in six states where Democratic support was weak and where Christian right networks were falsely alleging that the ACA would fund abortions. FPL's impact was reported to be instrumental in landing key votes for the bill. When in 2017 there was a movement to overturn the ACA, Jennifer Butler was among other leaders who protested outside the office of Senator Mitch McConnell.

In 2011 Jennifer Butler engaged in non-violent direct action with eleven clergy praying in the Capitol Rotunda for Republicans to cease efforts to balance the budget on the backs of low-income Americans. Also, Jennifer Butler joined others in bringing a golden calf to the Occupy Wall Street movement in New York City in October, and then to McPherson Square in Washington, D.C., in December.

In 2013 FPL co-led a faith march at the Capitol calling on Republicans to end the government shutdown and pass a moral budget that protected the poor.

In 2015 The White House named Jennifer Butler to chair the President's Advisory Council on Faith-Based and Neighborhood Partnerships.

In 2017 Jennifer Butler joined other religious leaders and lay leaders from across the country on Capitol Hill Monday to oppose attorney general nominee Jeff Sessions, describing the four-term Republican as a throwback to an era of racism and intolerance. The issue of whether businesses could refuse service to LGBTQ customers was also surfacing at this time, accentuated by a Department of Justice “religious freedom” order. FPL had worked in Florida to prevent housing discrimination against LGBTQ individuals.

In 2018, Jennifer Butler joined other religious leaders in June in front of the US Customs and Border Protection headquarters in Washington, DC and called on the Trump administration to end its "zero tolerance" policy of separating children from parents who cross the border. In July, FPL organized 14 women faith leaders in McAllen, Texas, to speak with refugees and activists about the government's treatment of immigrants at the border.

In 2019 Jennifer Butler was part of an National Public Radio interview about how the religious left is finding its voice in the era of the Trump presidency. Also, FPL hosted a press conference where religious leaders stood with state lawmakers to demand action on passage of the Workforce Act banning discrimination against LGBTQ Floridians.

In 2020 the Ohio chapter of Faith in Public life coordinated 100 Columbus faith leaders to sign a letter demanding that Columbus Mayor Andrew Ginther decrease funding to the Columbus Division of Police.

in 2021 Faith in Public Life organized Georgia members at the Georgia State Capitol in protest of the Georgia voting law SB 202 by handing out water bottles to state legislators. In June, billionaire philanthropist and novelist MacKenzie Scott announced the giving of grants to “286 Teams Empowering Voices the World Needs to Hear," and Jennifer Butler said that Faith in Public Life was granted a “significant multimillion-dollar gift.”
