= History of the Catholic Church in the United States =

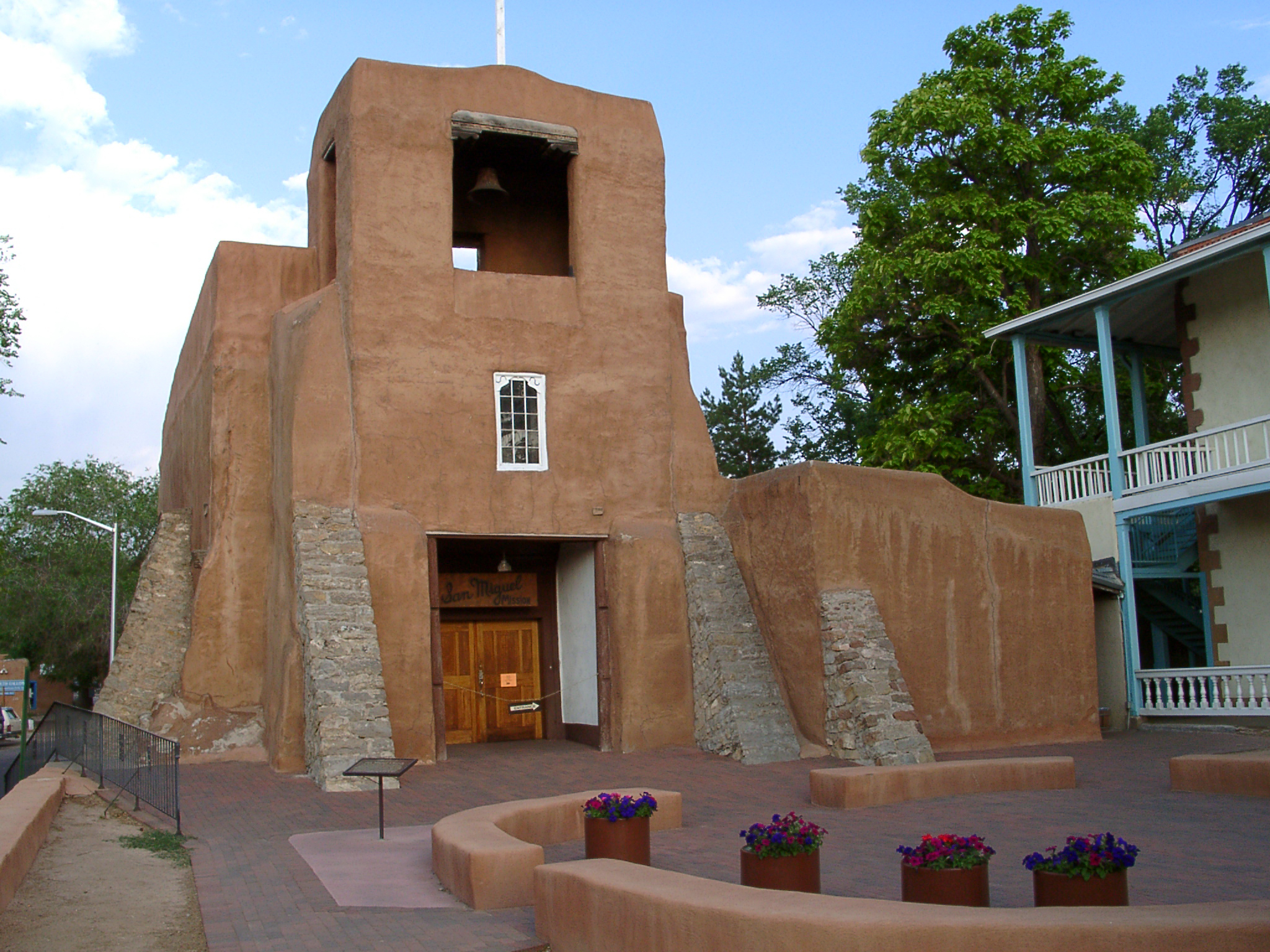
San Miguel Mission, in Santa Fe, New Mexico, established in 1610, is the oldest church in the United States.

The Catholic Church in the United States began in the colonial era, but by the mid-1800s, most of the Spanish, French, and Mexican influences had demographically faded in importance, with Protestant Americans moving west and taking over many formerly Catholic regions. Small Catholic pockets remained in Maryland, Alabama, Florida, and Louisiana, but scarcely anywhere else.

However, after 1840, American Catholicism grew through immigration from Europe, especially from Germans and Irish. After 1890, Catholic immigrants from Southern and Eastern Europe arrived in large numbers. The Church set up an elaborate infrastructure, based on local parishes organized into dioceses run by bishops appointed by the Pope. Each diocese set up a network of schools, colleges, hospitals, orphanages and other charitable institutions.

Many priests and nuns arrived from France and Ireland. By 1900, America was producing a sufficient supply of priests and nuns. The Catholic population was primarily working-class until after World War II when it increasingly moved into white-collar status and left the inner city for the suburbs. After 1960, the number of priests and nuns fell rapidly and new vocations plunged. However, the Catholic population was sustained by a large influx from Mexico and Central America.

As the Catholic colleges and universities matured, questions were raised about their adherence to orthodox Catholic theology. After 1980, the Catholic bishops became involved in politics, especially on issues relating to abortion and sexuality.

In the 2014, the Religious Landscape Survey published by the Pew Research Center, 20.8% of Americans identified themselves as Catholic. By 2016, 26% of Catholics had college degrees, and 36% of them earned over $100,000.

== Colonial era ==
=== In general ===
The history of Catholicism in the United States – prior to 1776 – often focuses on the 13 English-speaking colonies along the Atlantic seaboard, as it was they who declared independence from Great Britain in 1776, to form the United States of America. However, this history – of Catholicism in the United States – also includes the French and Spanish colonies, because they later became part of the contiguous United States. These Catholics were centered in what became Florida, Texas, California, Puerto Rico and much of rest of the Southwest.

Most of the Catholic population in the United States during the colonial period came from England, Germany, and France, with approximately 10,000 Irish Catholics immigrating by 1775, and they overwhelmingly settled in Maryland and Pennsylvania. In 1700, the estimated population of Maryland was 29,600, about one-tenth of which was Catholic (or approximately 3,000). By 1756, the number of Catholics in Maryland had increased to approximately 7,000, which increased further to 20,000 by 1765. In Pennsylvania, there were approximately 3,000 Catholics in 1756 and 6,000 by 1765. By the end of the American Revolutionary War in 1783, there were approximately 24,000 to 25,000 Catholics in the United States out of a total population of approximately 3 million.

The current dioceses of the United States are derived from a number of colonial-era dioceses. The following traces the succession of dioceses up to the first diocese that was completely contained in United States territory.

- Spanish dioceses gave rise to many successors in the United States:
  - The Spanish parts of the mainland United States were originally part of the Diocese of Mexico established in 1530, and later the Diocese of Durango when it split in 1620.
    - California became part of the Diocese of Sonora in 1779. The Diocese of Both Californias, based in San Diego, was established in 1840. After the Mexican–American War, the Mexican portion was split off in 1849, with the United States portion becoming the Diocese of Monterey.
    - New Mexico remained part of the Diocese of Durango until after it was annexed by the United States, with the Diocese of Santa Fe established in 1850.
    - Texas was organized into a prefecture apostolic in 1839, which became the Diocese of Galveston in 1847.
  - Although the French parts of the current United States were originally part of the Diocese of Quebec, after the French and Indian War this was transferred to the Diocese of Santiago de Cuba and later the Diocese of San Cristóbal de la Habana when it was created in 1787. In 1793, the Diocese of Louisiana and the Floridas was created, which was later renamed the Diocese of New Orleans.
  - Puerto Rico was originally under the jurisdiction of the Diocese of Seville in Spain. The Diocese of San Juan de Puerto Rico was established in 1511.
  - Guam and the Northern Mariana Islands were originally part of the Diocese of Cebu in the Philippines. They were split into the Apostolic Prefecture of Mariana Islands in 1902, which became the Diocese of Agaña in 1965.
- The English parts were originally under the jurisdiction of the Apostolic Vicariate of the London District. After the American Revolution, the Apostolic Prefecture of the United States was established in 1784, which became the Diocese of Baltimore in 1789.
- The Vicariate Apostolic of the Oregon Territory was established in 1843.
  - In 1846, the United States part of Oregon Territory became the Diocese of Oregon City.
  - The remainder became the Canadian Diocese of Vancouver Island, from which the Prefecture Apostolic of Alaska was created in 1894. Part of it became the Diocese of Juneau in 1951, with the rest becoming the Diocese of Fairbanks in 1962.
- The Apostolic Vicariate of Eastern Oceania was established in 1833.
  - Part of this was split into the Vicariate Apostolic of the Sandwich Islands in 1843, which became the Diocese of Honolulu in 1941.
  - Another part was split into the Apostolic Vicariate of Central Oceania in 1842. This became the Diocese of Apia, which included both Samoa and American Samoa, in 1966. In 1982, the American Samoa part was split into the Diocese of Samoa–Pago Pago.

=== Spanish missions ===
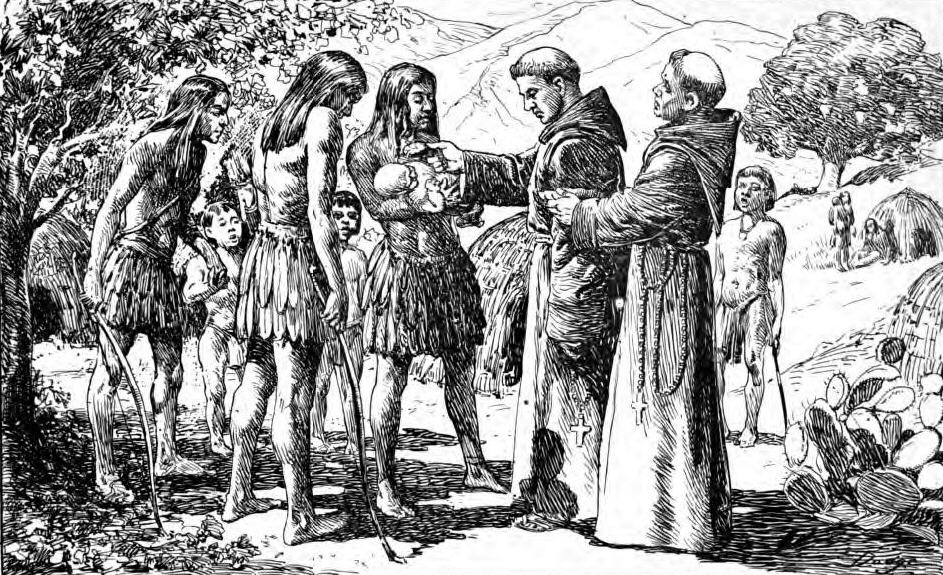
The first recorded baptisms in Alta California were performed at Los Cristianitos, "The Canyon of the Little Christians", in what is now San Diego county, just south of Mission San Juan Capistrano

Catholicism first came to the territories now forming the United States by way of Spanish colonists in the present-day Virgin Islands (1493), Puerto Rico (1508), Florida (1513), South Carolina (1566), Georgia (1568–1684), and the southwest. The first known Catholic Mass held in what would become the United States was in 1526 by Dominican friars Antonio de Montesinos and Anthony de Cervantes, who ministered to the San Miguel de Gualdape colonists for the 3 months the colony existed.

The influence of the Alta California missions (1769 and onwards) forms a lasting memorial to part of this heritage. Until the 19th century, the Franciscans and other religious orders had to operate their missions under the Spanish and Portuguese governments and military. Junípero Serra founded a series of missions in California which became important economic, political, and religious institutions. These missions brought grain, cattle and a new way of living to the Indian tribes of California. Overland routes were established from New Mexico that resulted in the colonization and founding of San Diego at Mission San Diego de Alcala (1760), Mission San Carlos Borromeo de Carmelo at Carmel-by-the-Sea, California in (1770), Mission San Francisco de Asis (Mission Dolores) at San Francisco (1776), Mission San Luis Obispo at San Luis Obispo (1772), Mission Santa Clara de Asis at Santa Clara (1777), Mission Senora Reina de los Angeles Asistencia in Los Angeles (1784), Mission Santa Barbara at Santa Barbara (1786), Mission San Juan Bautista in San Juan Bautista (1797), among numerous others.

=== French territories ===
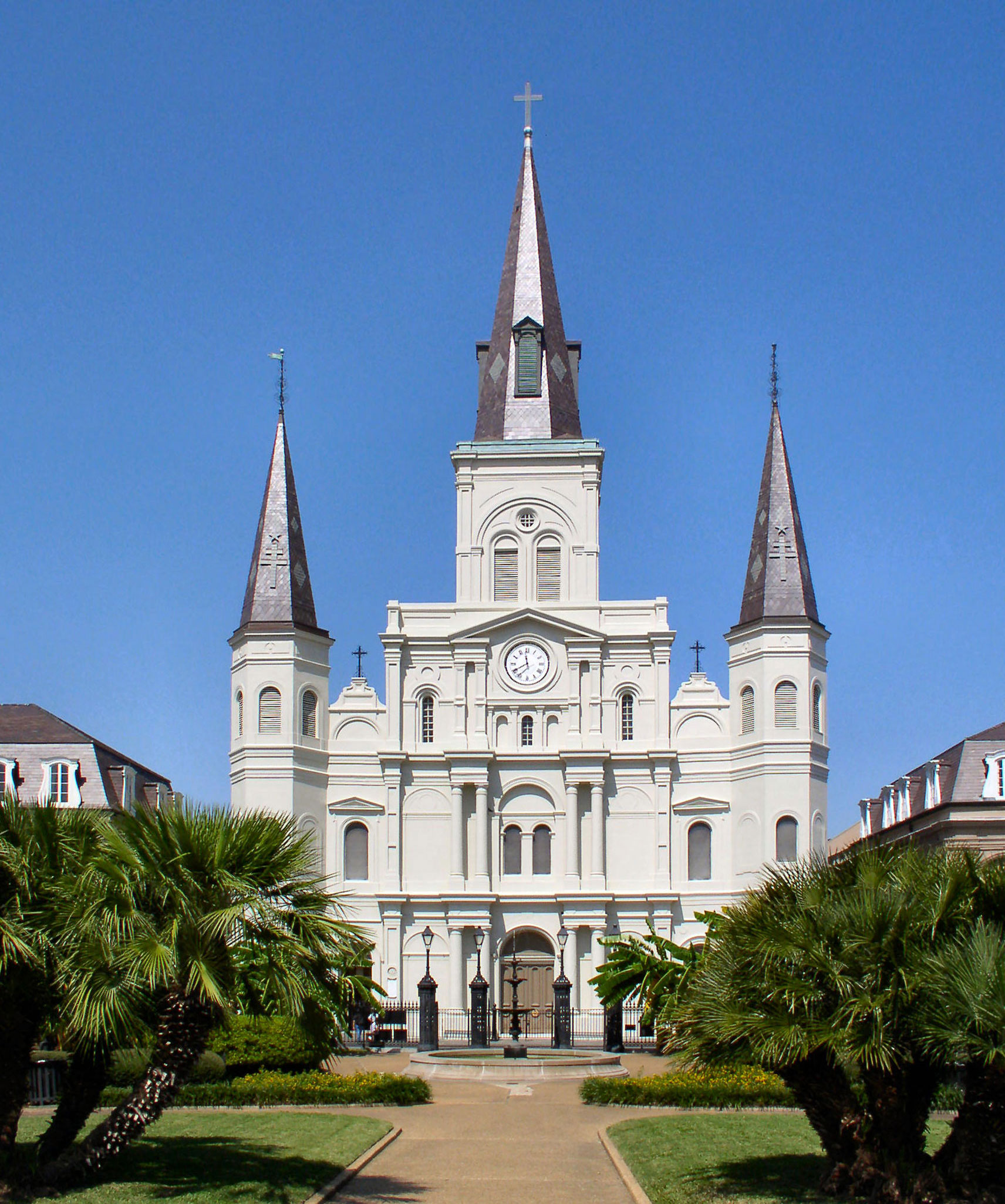
St. Louis Cathedral in New Orleans

In the French territories, Catholicism was ushered in with the establishment of missions such as Sault Ste. Marie, Michigan (1668), St. Ignace on the Straits of Mackinac, Michigan (1671) and Holy Family at Cahokia, Illinois (1699) and then colonies and forts in Detroit (1701), St. Louis, Mobile (1702), Kaskaskia (1703), Biloxi, Baton Rouge, New Orleans(1718), and Vincennes (1732). In the late 17th century, French expeditions, which included sovereign, religious and commercial aims, established a foothold on the Mississippi River and Gulf Coast. Small settlements were founded along the banks of the Mississippi and its major tributaries, from Louisiana to as far north as the region called the Illinois Country.

The French possessions were under the authority of the diocese of Quebec, under an archbishop, chosen and funded by the king. The religious fervor of the population was very weak; Catholics ignored the tithe, a 10% tax to support the clergy. By 1720, the Ursulines were operating a hospital in New Orleans. The Church did send Companions of the Seminary of Quebec and Jesuits as missionaries, to convert Native Americans. These missionaries introduced the Natives to Catholicism in stages.

=== English colonies ===
Catholicism was introduced to the English colonies with the founding of the Province of Maryland. Maryland was one of the few regions among the English colonies in North America that had a sizable Catholic population. However, the 1646 defeat of the Royalists in the English Civil War led to stringent laws against Catholic education and the extradition of known Jesuits from the colony, including Andrew White, and the destruction of their school at Calverton Manor. Due to immigration, by 1660 the population of the Province had gradually become predominantly Protestant. During the greater part of the Maryland colonial period, Jesuits continued to conduct Catholic schools clandestinely.

Maryland was a rare example of religious toleration in a fairly intolerant age, particularly amongst other English colonies which frequently exhibited a militant Protestantism. The Maryland Toleration Act, issued in 1649, was one of the first laws that explicitly defined tolerance of varieties of Christianity. It has been considered a precursor to the First Amendment.

After Virginia established Anglicanism as mandatory in the colony, numerous Puritans migrated from Virginia to Maryland. The government gave them land for a settlement called Providence (now called Annapolis). In 1650, the Puritans revolted against the proprietary government and set up a new government that outlawed both Catholicism and Anglicanism. The Puritan revolt lasted until 1658, when the Calvert family regained control and re-enacted the Toleration Act.

=== Origins of anti-Catholicism ===
American anti-Catholicism and Nativist opposition to Catholic immigrants had their origins in the Reformation. Because the Reformation, from the Protestant perspective, was based on an effort by Protestants to correct what they perceived to be errors and excesses of the Catholic Church, it formed strong positions against the Catholic interpretation of the Bible, the Catholic hierarchy and the Papacy. "To be English was to be anti-Catholic," writes Robert Curran. These positions were brought to the eastern seaboard of the New World by British colonists, predominantly Protestant, who opposed not only the Catholic Church in Europe and in French and Spanish-speaking colonies of the New World, but also the policies of the Church of England in their own homeland, which they believed perpetuated Catholic doctrine and practices, and, for that reason, deemed it to be insufficiently reformed.

Because many of the British colonists were Dissenters, such as the Puritans and Congregationalists, much of early American religious culture exhibited the anti-Catholic bias of these Protestant denominations. Monsignor John Tracy Ellis wrote that a "universal anti-Catholic bias was brought to Jamestown in 1607 and vigorously cultivated in all the Thirteen Colonies from Massachusetts to Georgia." Michael Breidenbach has argued that "a central reason, if not the central reason, why Protestants believed Catholicism was the greatest single threat to civil society and therefore why its adherents could not be tolerated...was the pope's claim (and Catholics' apparent acceptance of it) that he held temporal power over all civil rulers, including the right to depose a secular authority." Breidenbach argues that American Catholics did not in fact hold this view, but opponents largely ignored that. Colonial charters and laws contained specific proscriptions against Catholics. Monsignor Ellis noted that a common hatred of Catholics in general could unite Anglican clerics and Puritan ministers despite their differences and conflicts.

Before the Revolution, the Southern Colonies and three of the New England Colonies had established churches, either Congregational (Massachusetts Bay, Connecticut, and New Hampshire) or Anglican (Maryland, Virginia, North Carolina, South Carolina, and Georgia). This only meant that local tax money was spent for the local church, which sometimes (as in Virginia) handled poor relief and roads. Churches that were not established were tolerated and governed themselves; they functioned with private funds. The Middle Colonies (New York, New Jersey, Pennsylvania, and Delaware) and the Colony of Rhode Island and Providence Plantations had no established churches.

== American Revolution ==
By the time of the American Revolution, 35,000 Catholics formed 1.2% of the 2.5 million white population of the thirteen seaboard colonies. One of the signatories of the Declaration of Independence, Charles Carroll (1737-1832), owner of sixty thousand acres of land, was a Catholic and was one of the richest men in the colonies. Catholicism was integral to his career. He was dedicated to American Republicanism, but feared extreme democracy.

When the English colonies declared independence in 1776 — the 13 English-speaking colonies on the eastern seaboard — only a small fraction of the population was Catholic (largely in Maryland). Legislated anti-Catholicism was eventually voided by the First Amendment when the Bill of Rights was held to apply to the states as well as the federal government, in 1890. In the meantime virulent anti-Catholic sentiment continued.

At the time of the American Revolution, Catholics formed 1.6% of the population of the thirteen colonies.

Irish Catholics (unlike Lord Baltimore and the Earl of Ulster/Duke of York, their English Catholic landlords) were initially barred from settling in some of the colonies (before 1688, for example, Catholics had not arrived in New England), though "New York had an Irish Catholic governor, Thomas Dongan, and other Catholic officials." Middleton also notes: at one time or another, five colonies "specifically excluded Catholics from the franchise: Virginia, New York, Maryland, Rhode Island, and South Carolina." Throughout the Revolution American Catholic priests remained under the jurisdiction of the Bishop of the London District. But even during the colonial period the successive bishops had accepted the charge reluctantly, and were too far away to exercise much control. During the war, however, when the jurisdiction was in the hands of Bishop James Talbot, the brother of the Earl of Shrewsbury and coadjutor to Bishop Richard Challoner, he refused to have any communication with those who were his American ecclesiastical subjects. This was because neither he nor Challoner had any sympathy with the American rebel Catholics. They did not realize that American Catholics (though rebels) were rendering, as John Carroll said later, a service to their English Catholic brethren. This lack of communication, technically at least, proved a blessing in disguise, and removed all possibility of the accusation that American Catholics were receiving orders from an English Catholic bishop. At the close of the war, however, Bishop Talbot went so far as to refuse to give faculties to two Maryland priests who asked to return home. This eventually enabled Rome to make entirely new arrangements for the creation of an American diocese under American bishops.

Carroll said this about Catholic participation in the war:

"Their blood flowed as freely, in proportion to their numbers, to cement the fabric of independence as that of their fellow citizens. They concurred with perhaps greater unanimity than any other body of men in recommending and promoting from whose influence America anticipates all the blessings of justice, peace, plenty, good orders, and civil and religious liberty."

Several Catholic Americans were prominent in the war effort. Thomas Fitzsimons of Pennsylvania was Washington's secretary and aide-de-camp. General Stephen Moylan of Pennsylvania was a quartermaster general and afterwards the commander of a cavalry regiment. Captain John Barry is regarded as the father of the American navy. Another notable was Thomas Lloyd.

The French alliance had a considerable positive effect upon the fortunes of the American Catholic Church. Washington, for example, issued strict orders in 1775 that "Pope's Day," the colonial equivalent of the British Guy Fawkes Night, was not to be celebrated, so as to not offend the French allies. Massachusetts sent a chaplain to the French fleet when it arrived. When the French fleet sailed to Newport, Rhode Island, that colony repealed its act of 1664 that refused citizenship to Catholics.

The many Catholic foreign officers who served with the Continental Army or with America's allies, put the Revolution in debt to Catholics. These men included admirals of the French fleets, including François Joseph Paul de Grasse, Jean-Baptiste Donatien de Vimeur, comte de Rochambeau and Charles Hector, comte d'Estaing. The Count Marquis de Lafayette from France was a key advisor to Washington. Casimir Pulaski of Poland led American units and died in battle. Bernardo de Galvez, the Spanish Governor of Louisiana, prevented that colony's seizure by the British. His efforts also stopped the British from gaining a position on the west bank of the Mississippi, crucial for keeping the British out of that area at the end of the war. Galveston, Texas, is named after him.

== New Nation ==
In 1787 two Catholics, Daniel Carroll of Maryland and Thomas Fitzsimons of Pennsylvania, were members of the Continental Congress that met in Philadelphia to help frame the new United States Constitution. Four years later, in 1791, the First Amendment to the constitution was ratified. This amendment included the wording, "Congress shall make no law respecting an establishment of religion, or prohibiting the free exercise thereof..." This amendment officially granted freedom of religion to all American citizens, and began the eventual repeal of all anti-Catholic laws from the statute books of all of the new American states.

Following the Revolutionary War the Jesuit Fathers under the leadership of John Carroll, S.J. called several meetings of the clergy for the purpose of organizing the Catholic Church in America. The meetings, called the General Chapters, took place in 1783 and were held at the White Marsh Plantation (now Sacred Heart Church in Bowie, Maryland). Deliberations of the General Chapters led to the appointment of John Carroll by the Vatican as Prefect Apostolic, making him superior of the missionary church in the thirteen states, and to the first plans for Georgetown University. Also at White Marsh, the priests of the new nation elected John Carroll as the first American bishop on May 18, 1789.

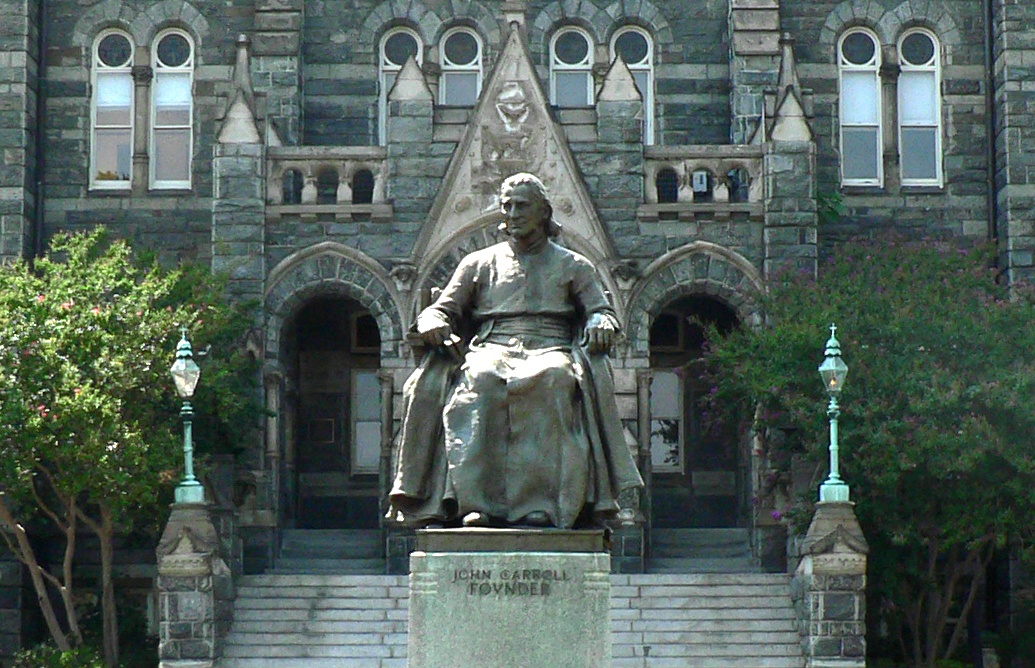
Statue of Archbishop John Carroll

Before independence in 1776 the Catholics in Britain's Thirteen Colonies in America were under the ecclesiastical jurisdiction of the Bishop of the Apostolic Vicariate of the London District, in England.

The Maryland clergy on November 6, 1783, sent a petition to the Holy See for permission for the missionaries to nominate a superior who would have some of the powers of a bishop. In response to that, Carroll – having been selected by his brother priests – was confirmed by Pope Pius VI, on June 6, 1784, as Superior of the Missions in the United States, with power to give the sacrament of confirmation. This act established a hierarchy in the United States.

The Holy See then established the Apostolic Prefecture of the United States on November 26, 1784. Because Maryland was one of the few regions of the new country with a large Catholic population, the apostolic prefecture was elevated to become the Diocese of Baltimore – the first diocese in the United States – on November 6, 1789.

John Carroll, a former Jesuit, became the first American-born head of the Catholic Church in the United States, although the papal suppression of the Jesuit order was still in effect. Carroll orchestrated the founding and early development of Georgetown University which began instruction on November 22, 1791. On March 29, 1800, Carroll ordained William Matthews as the first British-America-born Catholic priest ordained in America.

In 1788, John Jay, chief justice of the US Supreme Court and a Huguenot descendent, urged the New York Legislature to require office-holders to renounce foreign authorities "in all matters ecclesiastical as well as civil."In this regard, Jay was talking about the Holy See. In one state, North Carolina, the legislature did not repeal the Protestant test oath until 1868.

== 19th century ==
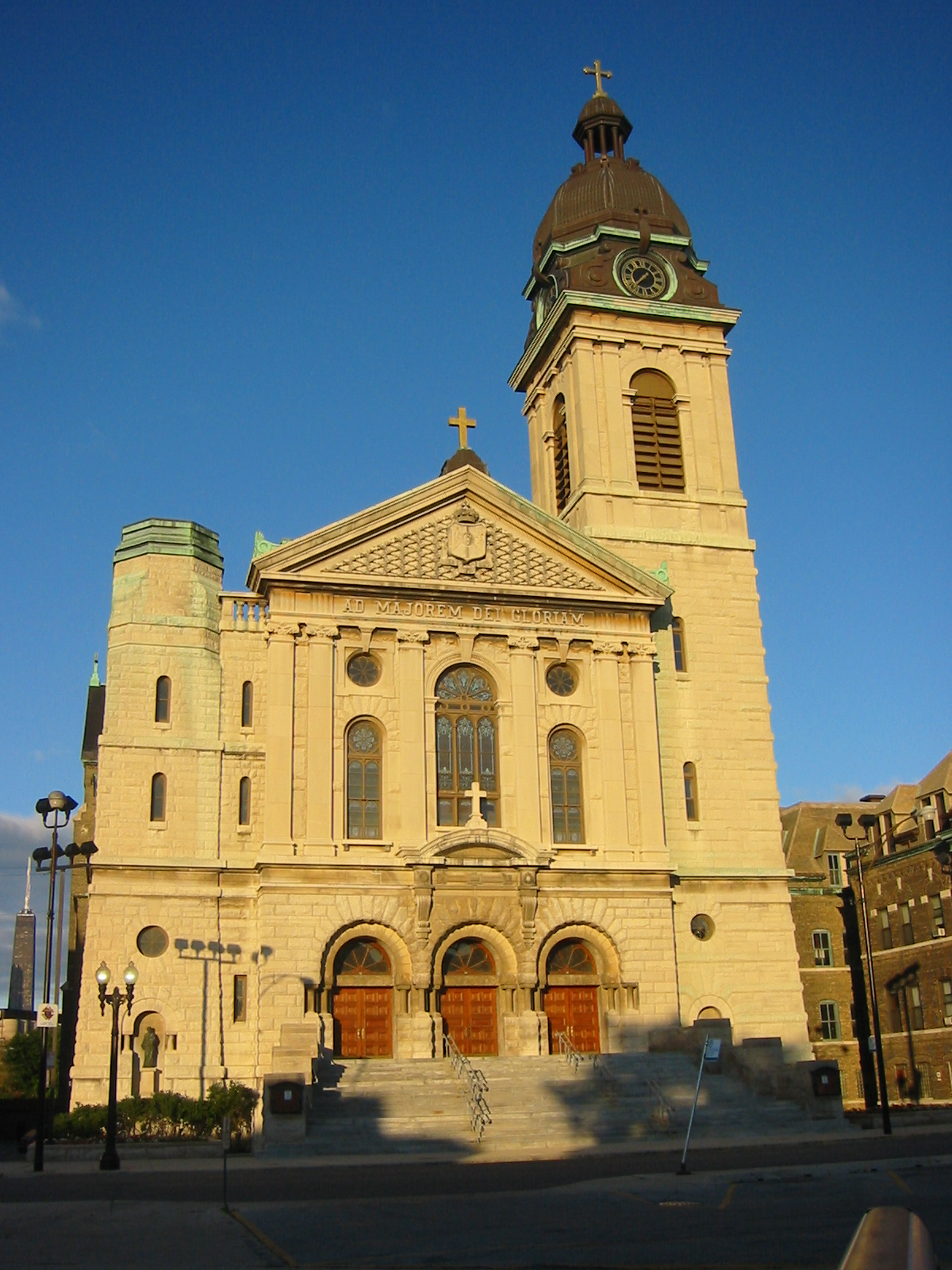
St. John Cantius Church, one of Chicago's 'Polish Cathedral style'.

The Catholic population of the United States, which had been 35,000 in 1790, increased to 195,000 in 1820 and then ballooned to about 1.6 million in 1850, by which time Catholics had become the country's largest denomination. Between 1860 and 1890 the population of Catholics in the United States tripled, primarily through immigration and high birth rates. By the end of the century, there were 12 million Catholics in the United States.

During the mid 19th century, a wave of immigrants from Europe arrived from Ireland and Germany, as well as England and the Netherlands. From the 1880s to 1914 a "new" wave arrived from Italy, Poland and Eastern Europe. Substantial numbers of Catholics also came from French Canada during the mid-19th century and settled in New England. After 1911 large numbers of Mexicans arrived.

Many Catholics stopped practicing their religion or became Protestants. However, there were about 700,000 converts to Catholicism from 1813 to 1893.

=== Archdiocese of Baltimore ===
Because Maryland was one of the few regions of the colonial United States that was predominantly Catholic, the first diocese in the United States was established in Baltimore. Thus, the Diocese of Baltimore achieved a pre-eminence over all future dioceses in the U.S. It was established as a diocese on November 6, 1789, and was elevated to the status of an archdiocese on April 8, 1808.

In 1858, the Sacred Congregation for the Propagation of the Faith (Propaganda Fide), with the approval of Pius IX, conferred "Prerogative of Place" on the Archdiocese of Baltimore. This decree gave the archbishop of Baltimore precedence over all the other archbishops of the United States (but not cardinals) in councils, gatherings, and meetings of whatever kind of the hierarchy (in conciliis, coetibus et comitiis quibuscumque) regardless of the seniority of other archbishops in promotion or ordination.

=== Dominance of Irish Americans ===
Beginning in the 1840s, Irish American Catholics comprised most of the bishops and controlled most of the Catholic colleges and seminaries in the United States. In 1875, John McCloskey of New York became the first American cardinal.

=== Parochial schools ===
The development of the American Catholic parochial school system can be divided into three phases. During the first (1750–1870), parochial schools appeared as ad hoc efforts by parishes, and most Catholic children attended public schools. During the second period (1870–1910), the Catholic hierarchy made a basic commitment to a separate Catholic school system. These parochial schools, like the big-city parishes around them, tended to be ethnically homogeneous; a German child would not be sent to an Irish school, nor vice versa, nor a Lithuanian pupil to either. Instruction in the language of the old country was common. In the third period (1910–1945), Catholic education was modernized and modeled after the public school systems, and ethnicity was deemphasized in many areas. In cities with large Catholic populations (such as Chicago and Boston) there was a flow of teachers, administrators, and students from one system to the other.

Catholic schools began as a program to shelter Catholic students from Protestant teachers (and schoolmates) in the new system of public schools that emerged in the 1840s.

In 1875, Republican President Ulysses S. Grant called for a Constitutional amendment that would prohibit the use of public funds for "sectarian" schools. Grant feared a future with "patriotism and intelligence on one side and superstition, ambition and greed on the other" which he identified with the Catholic Church. Grant called for public schools that would be "unmixed with atheistic, pagan or sectarian teaching." No such federal constitutional amendment ever passed, but most states did pass so-called "Blaine Amendments" that prohibited the use of public funds to fund parochial schools and are still in effect today.

=== Slavery debate ===
Two slaveholding states, Maryland and Louisiana, had large contingents of Catholic residents. Archbishop of Baltimore, John Carroll, had two black servants – one free and one a slave. The Society of Jesus owned a large number of slaves who worked on the community's farms. Realizing that their properties were more profitable if rented out to tenant farmers rather than worked by slaves, the Jesuits began selling off their slaves in 1837.

In 1839, Pope Gregory XVI issued the bull In supremo apostolatus. Its main focus was against slave trading, but it also clearly condemned racial slavery:

We, by apostolic authority, warn and strongly exhort in the Lord faithful Christians of every condition that no one in the future dare bother unjustly, despoil of their possessions, or reduce to slavery Indians, Blacks or other such peoples.

However, the American church continued in deeds, if not in public discourse, to support slaveholding interests. Some American bishops misinterpreted In Supremo as condemning only the slave trade and not slavery itself. Bishop John England of Charleston actually wrote several letters to the Secretary of State under President Van Buren explaining that the Pope, in In Supremo, did not condemn slavery but only the slave trade.

One outspoken critic of slavery was Archbishop John Baptist Purcell of Cincinnati, Ohio. In an 1863 Catholic Telegraph editorial, Purcell wrote:

"When the slave power predominates, religion is nominal. There is no life in it. It is the hard-working laboring man who builds the church, the school house, the orphan asylum, not the slaveholder, as a general rule. Religion flourishes in a slave state only in proportion to its intimacy with a free state, or as it is adjacent to it."

During the Civil War, American bishops continued to allow slave-owners to take communion. Some, like former priest Charles Chiniquy, claimed that Pope Pius IX was behind the Confederate cause, that the American Civil War was a plot against the United States of America by the Vatican. The Catholic Church, having by its very nature a universal view, urged a unity of spirit. Catholics in the North rallied to enlist. Nearly 150,000 Irish Catholics fought for the Union, many in the famed Irish Brigade, as well as approximately 40,000 German-Catholics, and 5,000 Polish-Catholic immigrants. Catholics became prominent in the officer corps, including over fifty generals and a half-dozen admirals. Along with the soldiers that fought in the ranks were hundreds of priests who ministered to the troops and Catholic religious sisters who assisted as nurses and sanitary workers.

After the war, in October 1866, President Andrew Johnson and Washington's mayor attended the closing session of a plenary council in Baltimore, giving tribute to the role Catholics played in the war and to the growing Catholic presence in America.

=== African-American Catholics ===
Because the South was over 90% Protestant, most African-Americans who adopted Christianity became Protestant; some became Catholics in the Gulf South, particularly Louisiana. The French Code Noir which regulated the role of slaves in colonial society guaranteed the rights of slaves to baptism, religious education, communion, and marriage. The parish church in New Orleans was unsegregated. Predominantly black religious orders emerged, including the Sisters of the Holy Family in 1842. The Church of Saint Augustine in the Tremé district is among a number of historically black parishes. Xavier University, America's only historically-black Catholic institute of higher learning, was founded in New Orleans by Saint Katherine Drexel in 1915.

Maryland Catholics owned slaves starting in the colonial era; in 1785, about 3,000 of the 16,000 Catholics were black. Some owners and slaves moved west to Kentucky. In 1835, Bishop John England, established free schools for black children in Charleston, South Carolina. White mobs forced it to close. African-American Catholics operated largely as segregated enclaves. They also founded separate religious institutes for black nuns and priests since diocesan seminaries would not accept them. For example, they formed two separate communities of black nuns: the Oblate Sisters of Providence in 1829 and the Holy Family Sisters in 1842.

James Augustine Healy was the first African American to become a priest. He became the second bishop of the Diocese of Portland, Maine in 1875. His brother, Patrick Francis Healy, joined the Society of Jesus (Jesuits) at the novitiate in Frederick, Maryland in 1850. Because of the rising threat of Civil War and the Jesuit custom of pursuing further studies in Europe, he was sent to Belgium in 1858. He earned a doctorate at the university of Leuven, becoming the first American of African descent to earn a doctorate; and he was ordained a priest in Liege, France in 1864. Immediately following the Civil War he was ordered to return to the U.S. and began teaching at Georgetown University, becoming its president in 1874.

In 1866, Archbishop Martin J. Spalding of Baltimore convened the Second Plenary Council of Baltimore, partially in response to the growing need for religious care for former slaves. Attending bishops remained divided over the issue of separate parishes for African-American Catholics.

In 1889, Daniel Rudd, a former slave and Ohio journalist, organized the National Black Catholic Congress, the first national organization for African-American Catholic lay men. The Congress met in Washington, D.C. and discussed issues such as education, job training, and "the need for family virtues."

In 2001, Bishop Wilton Gregory was appointed president of the United States Conference of Catholic Bishops, the first African American ever to head an episcopal conference. He has since been named a cardinal, another first for an African-American.

=== Plenary Councils of Baltimore ===
Catholic bishops met in three of Plenary Councils in Baltimore in 1852, 1866 and 1884, establishing national policies for all diocese. One result of the Third Plenary Council of Baltimore in 1884 was the development of the Baltimore Catechism, which became the standard text for Catholic education in the United States and remained so until the 1960s, when Catholic churches and schools began moving away from catechism-based education.

Another result of this council was the establishment of The Catholic University of America, the national Catholic university in the United States.

=== Labor union movement ===
Irish Catholics took a prominent role in shaping America's labor movement. Most Catholics were unskilled or semi-skilled urban workers, and the Irish used their strong sense of solidarity to form a base in unions and in local Democratic politics. By 1910 a third of the leadership of the labor movement was Irish Catholic, and German Catholics were actively involved as well.

=== Anti-Catholicism ===
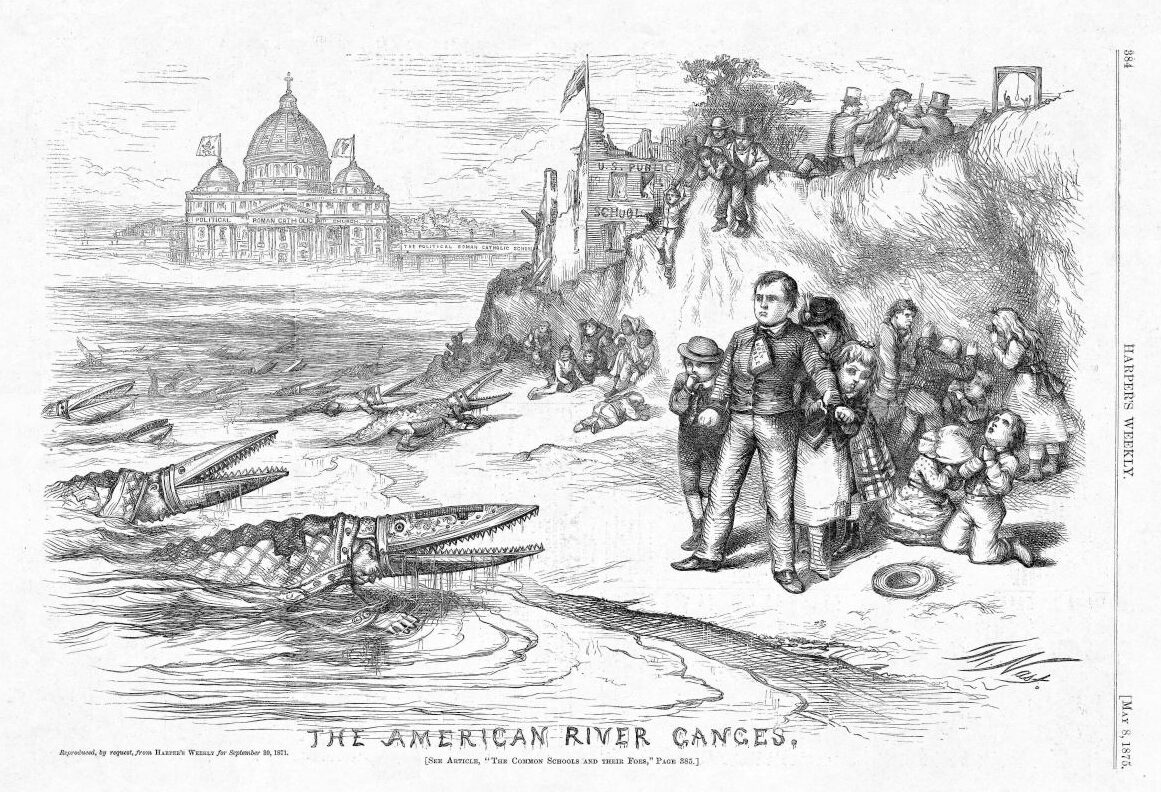
An 1876 editorial cartoon by Thomas Nast showing bishops as crocodiles attacking public schools, with the connivance of Irish Catholic politicians

Some anti-immigrant and Nativism movements, like the Know Nothings have also been anti-Catholic. Anti-Catholicism was led by Protestant ministers who labeled Catholics as un-American "Papists", incapable of free thought without the approval of the Pope, and thus incapable of full republican citizenship. This attitude faded after Catholics proved their citizenship by service in the American Civil War, but occasionally emerged in political contests, especially the presidential elections of 1928 and 1960, when Catholics were nominated by the Democratic Party. Democrats won 65–80% of the Catholic vote in most elections down to 1964, but since then have split about 50–50. Typically, Catholics have taken conservative positions on anti-communism and sexual behavior, and liberal positions on the welfare state.

=== Americanist controversy ===
Americanism was considered a heresy by the Vatican that consisted of too much theological liberalism and too ready acceptance of the American policy of separation of church and state. Rome feared that such a heresy was held by Irish Catholic leaders in the United States, such as Isaac Hecker, and bishops John Keane, John Ireland, and John Lancaster Spalding, as well as the magazines Catholic World and Ave Marie. Allegations came from German American bishops angry with growing Irish domination of the Church.

The Vatican grew alarmed in the 1890s, and the Pope issued an encyclical denouncing Americanism in theory. In "Longinqua oceani" (1895; “Wide Expanse of the Ocean”), Pope Leo XIII warned the American hierarchy not to export their unique system of separation of church and state. In 1898 he lamented an America where church and state are "dissevered and divorced," and wrote of his preference for a closer relationship between the Catholic Church and the State. Finally, in his pastoral letter Testem benevolentiae (1899; “Witness to Our Benevolence”) to Cardinal James Gibbons, Pope Leo XIII condemned other forms of Americanism. In response, Gibbons denied that American Catholics held any of the condemned views.

Leo's pronouncements effectively ended the Americanist movement and curtailed the activities of American progressive Catholics. The Irish Catholics increasingly demonstrated their total loyalty to the Pope, and traces of liberal thought in the Catholic colleges were suppressed. At bottom it was a cultural conflict, as the conservative Europeans were alarmed mostly by the heavy attacks on the Catholic church in Germany, France and other countries, and did not appreciate the active individualism, self-confidence and optimism of the American church. In reality Irish Catholic laymen were deeply involved in American politics, but the bishops and priests kept their distance.

== 20th century ==
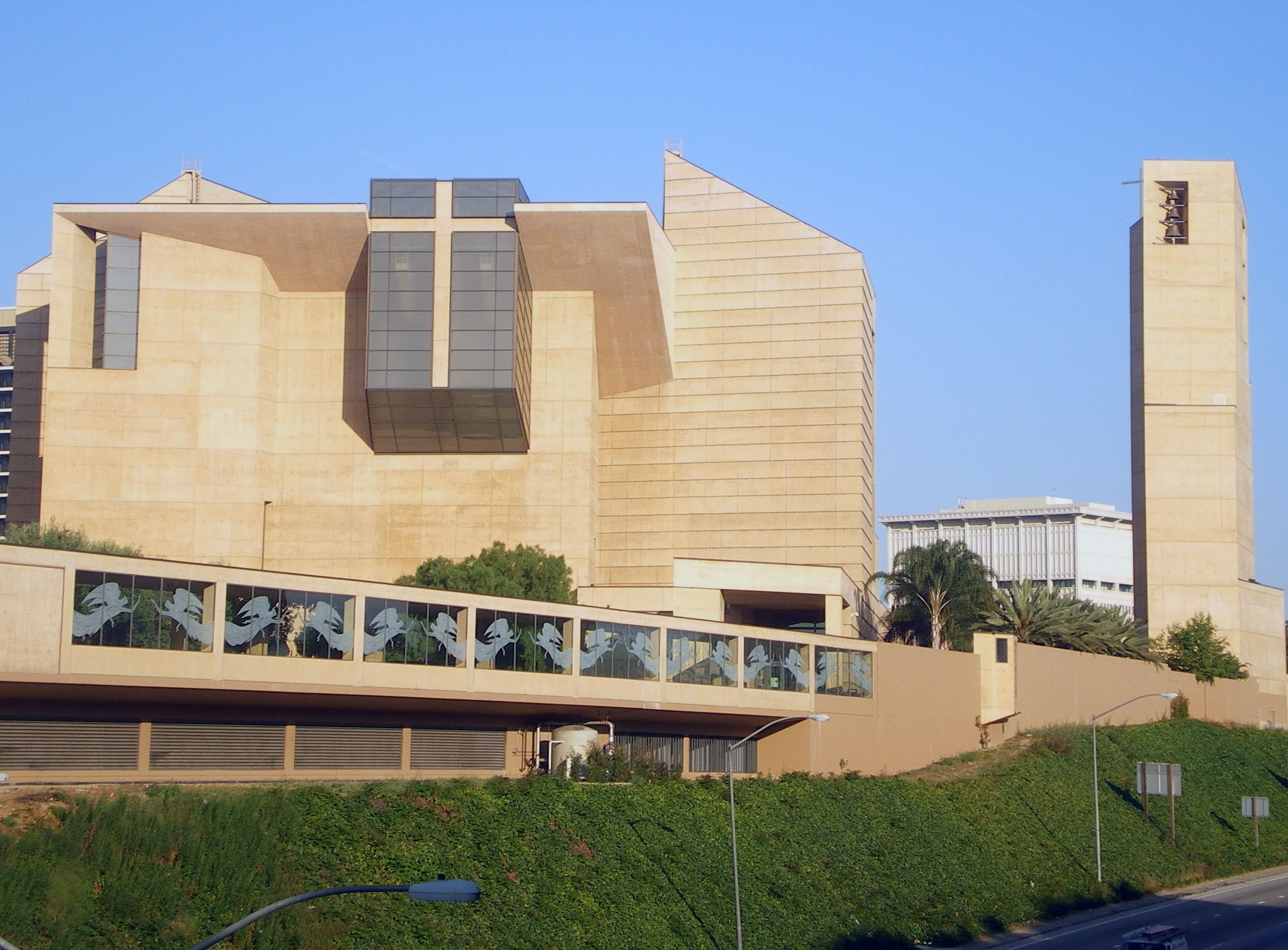
The Cathedral of Our Lady of the Angels is the seat of the Archdiocese of Los Angeles.

By the beginning of the 20th century, approximately one-sixth of the population of the United States was Catholic. By the end of the 20th century, Catholics constituted 24% of the population.

=== National Catholic War Council ===
It was John J. Burke, editor of the Catholic World, who first recognized the urgency of the moment. Burke had long argued for a national outlook and sense of unity among the country's Catholics. The war provided the impetus to initiate these efforts. The Catholic hierarchy was eager to show its enthusiastic support for the war effort. In order to better address challenges posed by World War I, the American Catholic hierarchy in 1917 chose to meet collectively for the first time since 1884.

In August 1917, on the campus of The Catholic University of America in Washington, D.C., Burke, with the backing of Cardinal Gibbons and other bishops, convened a meeting to discuss organizing a national agency to coordinate the war effort of the American Catholic community. One hundred and fifteen delegates from sixty-eight dioceses, together with members from the Catholic press and representatives from twenty-seven national Catholic organizations attended this first meeting.

The result of the meeting was the formation of the National Catholic War Council, "to study, coordinate, unify and put in operation all Catholic activities incidental to the war." An executive committee, chaired by Cardinal George Mundelein of Chicago, was formed in December 1917, to oversee the work of the Council. The mandate of the newly formed organization included the promotion of Catholic participation in the war, through chaplains, literature, and care for the morale of the troops, as well as (for the first time) lobbying for Catholic interests in the nation's capital.

=== NCWC ===
In 1919, the National Catholic Welfare Council, composed of US Catholic bishops, founded NCWC at the urging of heads of Catholic women's organizations desiring a federation for concerted action and national representation. The formal federation evolved from the coordinated efforts of Catholic women's organizations in World War I in assisting servicemen and their families and doing relief work.

=== Bureau of Immigration ===
In 1920, the National Catholic Welfare Council established a Bureau of Immigration to assist immigrants in getting established in the United States. The Bureau launched a port assistance program that met incoming ships, helped immigrants through the immigration process and provided loans to them. The bishops, priests, and laymen and women of the National Catholic Welfare Conference (NCWC) became some of the most outspoken critics of US immigration.

=== Bishops' Program of Social Reconstruction ===
Following the war many hoped that a new commitment to social reform would characterize the ensuing peace. The Council saw an opportunity to use its national voice to shape reform and in April 1918 created a Committee for Reconstruction. John A. Ryan wrote the Bishops' Program of Social Reconstruction.

On February 12, 1919, the National Catholic War Council issued the "Bishops' Program of Social Reconstruction," through a carefully planned public relations campaign. The plan offered a guide for overhauling America's politics, society, and economy based on Pope Leo XIII's Rerum Novarum and a variety of American influences.

The Program received a mixed reception both within the Church and outside it. The National Catholic War Council was a voluntary organization with no canonical status. Its ability to speak authoritatively was thus questioned. Many bishops threw their support behind the Program, but a few, such as Bishop William Turner of Buffalo and William Henry O'Connell of Boston, opposed it. O'Connell believed some aspects of the plan smacked too much of socialism. Response outside the Church was also divided: labor organizations backed it, for example, and business groups criticized it.

=== Compulsory Education Act ===
After World War I, some states concerned about the influence of immigrants and "foreign" values looked to public schools for help. The states drafted laws designed to use schools to promote a common American culture.

In 1922, the Masonic Grand Lodge of Oregon sponsored a bill to require all school-age children to attend public school systems. With support of the Knights of the KKK and Democratic Governor Walter M. Pierce, the Compulsory Education Act was passed by a vote of 115,506 to 103,685. Its primary purpose was to shut down Catholic schools in Oregon, but it also affected other private and military schools. The constitutionality of the law was challenged in court and ultimately struck down by the Supreme Court in Pierce v. Society of Sisters (1925) before it went into effect.

The law caused outraged Catholics to organize locally and nationally for the right to send their children to Catholic schools. In Pierce v. Society of Sisters (1925), the United States Supreme Court declared the Oregon's Compulsory Education Act unconstitutional in a ruling that has been called "the Magna Carta of the parochial school system."

=== 28th International Eucharistic Congress ===
In 1926, the 28th International Eucharistic Congress was held in Chicago, making it the first eucharistic congress held in the United States. It was considered a major event for the Catholic Church in the United States and attracted several hundred thousand attendees over the course of several days.

=== 1928 Presidential election ===
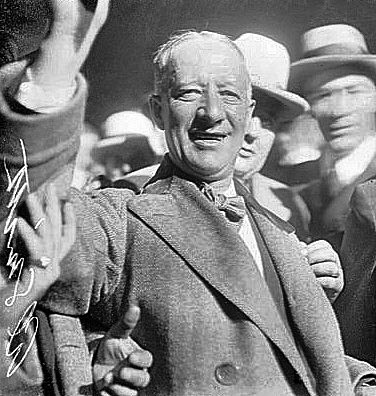
Al Smith

In 1928, Al Smith became the first Catholic to gain a major party's nomination for president and his religion became an issue during the campaign. Many Protestants feared that Smith would take orders from church leaders in Rome in making decisions affecting the country.

=== Catholic Worker Movement ===
The Catholic Worker movement began as a means to combine Dorothy Day's history in American social activism, anarchism, and pacifism with the tenets of Catholicism (including a strong current of distributism), five years after her 1927 conversion. The group started with the Catholic Worker newspaper, created to promote Catholic social teaching and stake out a neutral, pacifist position in the war-torn 1930s. This grew into a "house of hospitality" in the slums of New York City and then a series of farms for people to live together communally. The movement quickly spread to other cities in the United States, and to Canada and the United Kingdom; more than 30 independent but affiliated CW communities had been founded by 1941. Well over 100 communities exist today, including several in Australia, the United Kingdom, Canada, Germany, The Netherlands, the Republic of Ireland, Mexico, New Zealand, and Sweden.

=== Catholic Conference on Industrial Problems ===
The Catholic Conference on Industrial Problems (1923–1937) was conceived by Fr. Raymond McGowan as a way of bringing together Catholic leaders in the fields of theology, labor, and business, with a view to promoting awareness and discussion of Catholic social teaching. Its first meeting was held in Milwaukee. While it was the venue for important discussions during its existence, its demise was due in part to lack of participation by business executives who perceived the dominant tone of the group as anti-business.

=== Hospitals ===
As the urban population surged in the late 19th century, the major denominations built hospitals in the cities. A large fraction of patients were Catholic immigrants, and the Church reached out to them. In 1915, the Catholic religious orders for women operated 541 hospitals. They were open to patients regardless of religion. Costs were minimized by relying heavily on the work of women students who paid tuition and nuns who had taken a vow of poverty.

In 1945, there were 685 Catholic hospitals with a bed capacity of 87,000. Fifteen years later, there were 800 hospitals with 137,000 beds. Between 1960 and 1970, the number of patients nearly doubled. By 2000, however, mergers reduced the number of smaller hospitals, while patient admissions continued to grow rapidly, with heavy federal funding from Medicare and Medicaid.

In the late 20th century the hospitals increasingly closed their training programs and relied on paid graduate nurses who had college degrees in nursing. In the 21st century, as the cohorts of nuns aged, they turned their hospitals over to lay boards thus allowing the last generation of sister administrators to retire.

=== 1960s ===
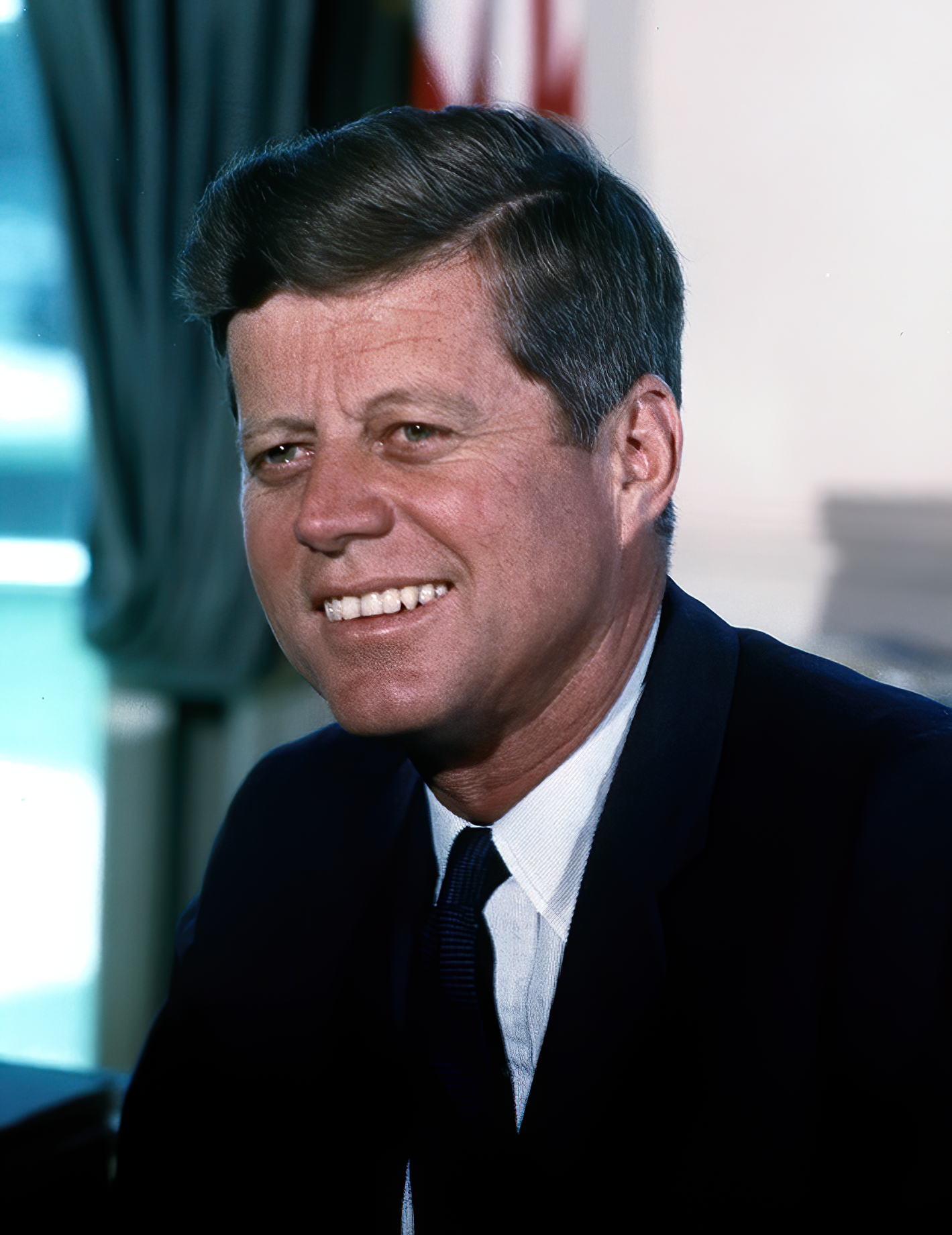
John F. Kennedy, 35th President, 1961–1963.

The 1960s marked a profound transformation of the role of the Catholic Church in the politics.

Religion was a divisive issue during the presidential campaign of 1960. Senator John F. Kennedy won the Democratic nomination. His base was among urban Catholics and polls showed they rallied to his support while most Protestants favored his opponent Richard Nixon. The old fear was raised by some Protestants that President Kennedy would take orders from the pope. Kennedy famously told the Greater Houston Ministerial Association on September 12, 1960, "I am not the Catholic candidate for President. I am the Democratic Party's candidate for President who also happens to be a Catholic. I do not speak for my Church on public matters – and the Church does not speak for me." He promised to respect the separation of church and state and not to allow Catholic officials to dictate public policy to him. Kennedy also raised the question of whether one-quarter of Americans were relegated to second-class citizenship just because they were Catholic. With his slim victory in November 1960, he broke the Protestant monopoly on the White House. The New York Times, summarizing the research of pollsters spoke of a “narrow consensus” among the experts that Kennedy had won more than he lost as a result of his Catholicism. After that, objections to Catholic candidates as such were seldom heard. Still, anti-Catholicism did not disappear in November 1960; for instance, Kennedy navigated treacherous religious debates in 1961 as he sought to pass his education proposal and mollify wary American Protestants. By 2004, Catholics were split about evenly between the Protestant (George W. Bush) and the Catholic (John F. Kerry) candidates. This was still true in 2020, when Joe Biden became only the second Catholic president. His religious affiliation sparked little controversy.

=== 1970s ===
The number of priests, brothers and nuns dropped sharply in the 1960s and 1970s as many left and few replacements arrived. Catholic parochial schools had been built primarily in the cities, with few in the suburbs or small towns. Many continue to operate, but with the loss of so many low-cost nuns, they have to hire much more expensive lay teachers. Most inner-city parishes saw white flight to the suburbs, so by the 1990s the remaining schools often had a largely minority student body, which attracts upwardly mobile students away from the low-quality, high-violence, free public schools.

==== Roe v. Wade ====
On January 22, 1973, the Supreme Court of the United States announced its decision in the Roe v. Wade case, finding that a constitutional right to privacy prohibited interference with a woman's obtaining an abortion. The Catholic Church was one of the few institutional voices opposing the decision at the time. Though a majority of Catholics have agreed with the hierarchy in their insistence on legal protection of the unborn, some—including prominent politicians—have not, leading to perennial controversies concerning the responsibilities of Catholics in American public life. The bishops took the initiative and were able to form a political coalition with Fundamentalist Protestants in opposition to abortion laws.

=== 1980s ===
Sanctuary of refugees from Central American civil wars was a movement in the 1980s. It was part of a broader anti-war movement positioned against U.S. foreign policy in Central America. By 1987, 440 sites in the United States had been declared "sanctuary congregations" or "sanctuary cities" open to migrants from the civil wars in El Salvador and Guatemala. These sites included university campuses.

The movement originated along the U.S. border with Mexico in Arizona but was also strong in Chicago, Philadelphia, and California. In 1981, Rev. John Fife and Jim Corbett, among others, began bringing Central American refugees into the United States. It was their intent to offer sanctuary, or faith-based protection, from the political violence that was taking place in El Salvador and Guatemala. The Department of Justice indicted several activists in south Texas for assisting refugees. Later 16 activists in Arizona were indicted, including Fife and Corbett in 1985; 11 were brought to trial and 8 were convicted of alien smuggling and other charges. The defendants claimed their actions were justifiable to save lives of people who would be killed and had no other way to escape.

This movement has been succeeded in the 2000s by the movement of churches and other houses of worship, to shelter immigrants in danger of deportation. The New Sanctuary Movement is a network of houses of worship that facilitates this effort.

== 21st century ==
=== Immigration ===
Modern Catholic immigrants come to the United States from the Philippines, Poland, and Latin America (especially Mexico). This multiculturalism and diversity has greatly influenced the flavor of Catholicism in the United States. For example, many dioceses serve in both the English and Spanish languages. This updates the longtime American practice of opening separate churches for parishioners from particular immigrant communities, such as Irish, German, Italian, etc., as in the building of St. Raphael's Cathedral in Iowa in the 1830s.

A 2008 survey by the Pew Forum on Religion & Public Life, a project of the Pew Research Center, found that 23.9% of 300 million Americans (i.e., 72 million) identified themselves as Catholic and that 29% of these were Hispanic/Latino, while nearly half of all Catholics under 40 years of age were Hispanic/Latino. The survey also found that white American Catholics were seven times more likely to have graduated high school than Hispanic/Latino Catholics, and that over twice as many Hispanic/Latino Catholics earned under $30,000 per year as their white counterparts. According to the U.S. Conference of Catholic Bishops, 15% of new priests are Hispanic/Latino and there are 28 active and 12 inactive Hispanic/Latino bishops, 9% of the total. According to Luis Lugo, the director of the Pew Forum on Religion and Public Life, nearly a quarter of all Catholics in the United States are foreign born. He notes: "To know what the country will be like in three decades, look at the Catholic church."

=== Sex abuse scandals ===
In the later 20th century "the Catholic Church in the United States became the subject of controversy due to allegations of clerical child abuse of children and adolescents, of episcopal negligence in arresting these crimes, and of numerous civil suits that cost Catholic dioceses hundreds of millions of dollars in damages." Although evidence of such abuse was uncovered in other countries, the vast majority of known sex abuse cases occurred in the United States.

Major lawsuits emerged in 2001 and subsequent years claiming some priests had sexually abused minors. These allegations of priests sexually abusing children were widely reported in the news media. Some commentators have argued that media coverage of the issue has been excessive compared with similar cases in the education system. Some priests resigned, others were defrocked and jailed, and there were financial settlements with many victims.

One estimate suggested that up to 3% of U.S. priests were involved. The United States Conference of Catholic Bishops commissioned a comprehensive study that found that four percent of all priests who served in the US from 1950 to 2002 faced some sort of sexual accusation.

The Church was widely criticized when it emerged that some bishops had known about abuse allegations, and reassigned accused priests after first sending them to psychiatric counseling. Some bishops and psychiatrists contended that the prevailing psychology of the times suggested that such treatment could cure sexually abusive behavior. Pope John Paul II responded by declaring that "there is no place in the priesthood and religious life for those who would harm the young".

The U.S. Church instituted reforms to prevent future abuse by requiring background checks for Church employees; because the vast majority of victims were teenage boys, the worldwide Church also prohibited the ordination of men with "deep–seated homosexual tendencies." Dioceses faced with an allegation are now required to alert the authorities, conduct an investigation and remove the accused from duty.

In 2008, the Vatican affirmed that the scandal was an "exceptionally serious" problem, but estimated that it was "probably caused by "no more than 1 per cent" of the over 400,000 Catholic priests worldwide.

=== Political stances ===
The Catholic Church has tried to influence legislation on social issues such as outlawing abortion and euthanasia.

In August 2012 the New York Times, reviewed the religion of the nine top national leaders: the presidential and vice-presidential nominees, the Supreme Court justices, the House Speaker, and the Senate majority leader. There were nine Catholics (six justices, both vice-presidential candidates, and the Speaker), three Jews (all from the Supreme Court), two Mormons (including the Republican presidential nominee Mitt Romney) and one African-American Protestant (incumbent President Barack Obama). There were no white Protestants.

Catholics in 2022 active in politics are members of both major parties, and hold many important offices. The most prominent have included President Joe Biden, Chief Justice John Roberts, Speaker of the House Nancy Pelosi, and Governor of California Gavin Newsom. Additionally, Democratic governor Bill Richardson and Republican former mayor Rudy Giuliani, both Catholics, sought the nomination for their respective parties in the 2008 presidential election. As of 2021, the Supreme Court includes 6 Catholics, including Chief Justice John Roberts and five associate justices: Clarence Thomas, Samuel Alito, Sonia Sotomayor, Amy Coney Barrett and Brett Kavanaugh. For seven years (beginning with the appointment of Justice Sotomayor in 2009 and ending with the death of Justice Scalia in 2016), Catholics comprised six justices on the court.

=== Human sexuality ===
The Church requires members to eschew homosexual practices, artificial contraception, and sex out of wedlock, as well as non-procreative sexual practices, including masturbation. Procuring or assisting in an abortion can carry the penalty of excommunication, as a specific offense.

The official Catholic teaching regards sexuality as "naturally ordered to the good of spouses" as well as the generation of children.

The Catholic Church has staunch anti-abortion efforts in all societies and endorses behavioral changes like abstinence instead of condom use to controlling the spread of HIV/AIDS.

==== Contraception ====
The Catholic Church maintains its opposition to birth control. Some Catholic Church members and non-members criticize this belief as contributing to overpopulation, and poverty.

Pope Paul VI reaffirmed the Church's position in his 1968 encyclical Humanae Vitae (Human Life). In this encyclical, the Pope acknowledges the realities of modern life, scientific advances, as well as the questions and challenges these raise. Furthermore, he explains that the purpose of intercourse is both "unitive and procreative", that is to say it strengthens the relationship of the husband and wife as well as offering the chance of creating new life. As such, it is a natural and full expression of our humanity. He writes that contraception "contradicts the will of the Author of life [God]. Hence to use this divine gift [sexual intercourse] while depriving it, even if only partially, of its meaning and purpose, is equally repugnant to the nature of man and of woman, and is consequently in opposition to the plan of God and His holy will."

The Church says its doctrines on sexual intercourse are based on a correct reading of the Natural law: intercourse must at once be both the renewal of the consummation of marriage and open to procreation. If each of these postulates are not met, the act of intercourse is, according to Natural Law, an objectively grave sin. Therefore, since artificial contraception expressly prevents the creation of a new life (and, the Church would argue, removes the sovereignty of God over all of Creation), contraception is unacceptable. The Church sees abstinence as the only objective moral strategy for preventing the transmission of HIV.

==== Homosexual behavior ====
The Catholic catechism teaches that all Catholics must practice chastity according to their states of life, and Catholics with homosexual tendencies must practice chastity in the understanding that homosexual acts are "intrinsically disordered" and "contrary to the natural law." The Vatican has reiterated the standing instruction against ordaining gay candidates for the priesthood.

== See also ==
- 19th century history of the Catholic Church in the United States
- 20th century history of the Catholic Church in the United States
- History of the Catholic Church in Florida
- Catholic Church in French Louisiana
- Catholic Church in the United States
- Catholic schools in the United States
- Catholic social activism in the United States
- Catholicism and American politics
- Ecclesiastical property in the United States
- Indian Mass
- National Museum of Catholic Art and History
