= Mazie E. Clemens =

American journalist (1890s–1952)

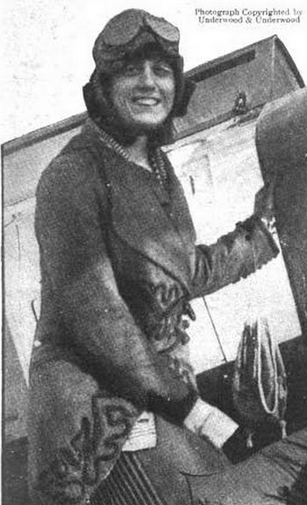
- Mazie E. Clemens from a 1920 publication.
- Born: 1890s
- Died: March 4, 1952; New York
- Occupation: journalist
- Known for: World War I correspondent, worked for National Catholic War Council

Mazie E. Clemens (born 1890s, died March 4, 1952) was an American journalist who served as Special Representative of the National Catholic War Council during World War I. Walter Winchell counted her among the "Daredevil Angels of the Press" in his 1950 list of outstanding women journalists.

== Early life ==
Mazie E. Clemens was the daughter of Richard Clemens and Ellen Clemens of New York. She was sometimes described as a relative of Mark Twain's.

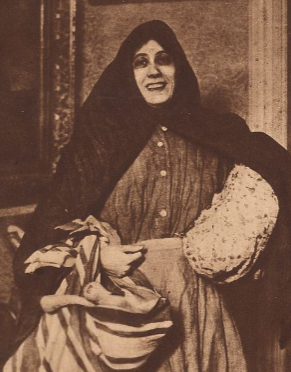
Mazie E. Clemens demonstrating her "peasant girl" costume, from a 1919 publication.

== Career ==
Clemens worked as a librarian and reporter at the New York World newspaper before World War I, and a war correspondent for the Philadelphia Public Ledger. She was Special Representative of the National Catholic War Council, working in Europe, during and after World War I. She interviewed Catholic leaders including Marechal Foch, Cardinal Amette, and Elisabeth of Bavaria, for the organization's published bulletin. In late 1919 she disguised herself as an Italian peasant to carry supplies into Fiume, across a blockade. "I wore a blue cotton dress and a gray woolen shawl furnished by the family of an Italian naval officer with connections in New York City," she explained afterwards; "Within a few yards of the city I found myself a woman alone. The entire town, especially around the railroad station, seemed to be one mass of soldiers, but I managed to elude them."

After the war, she covered scandals and murder investigations, and testified in criminal trials. Walter Winchell counted her among the "Daredevil Angels of the Press" in his 1950 list of outstanding women journalists.

In later years, she worked as a Deputy Commissioner of Corrections for the State of New York, overseeing the prison commissary at Welfare Island. She was also an auditor for the state's Bureau of Internal Revenue. She was also "official biographer" of Patrick Joseph Hayes, an American cardinal and Archbishop of New York.

== Personal life ==
Mazie E. Clemens married stockbroker Louis Walter Caldwell in 1930. She was widowed when Caldwell died in 1937; she died in 1952, in her fifties, in New York. Her will left a donation to the Damon Runyon Cancer Fund, an oil painting to the American Irish Historical Society, and money for the care of her dogs, Brian Boru and Skippy, saying "I would rather they could live their lives out if possible and not be destroyed." There is a folder of correspondence from Mazie Clemens in the National Catholic War Council papers, at the Catholic University of America.
