= National Museum of Catholic Art and History =

American museum

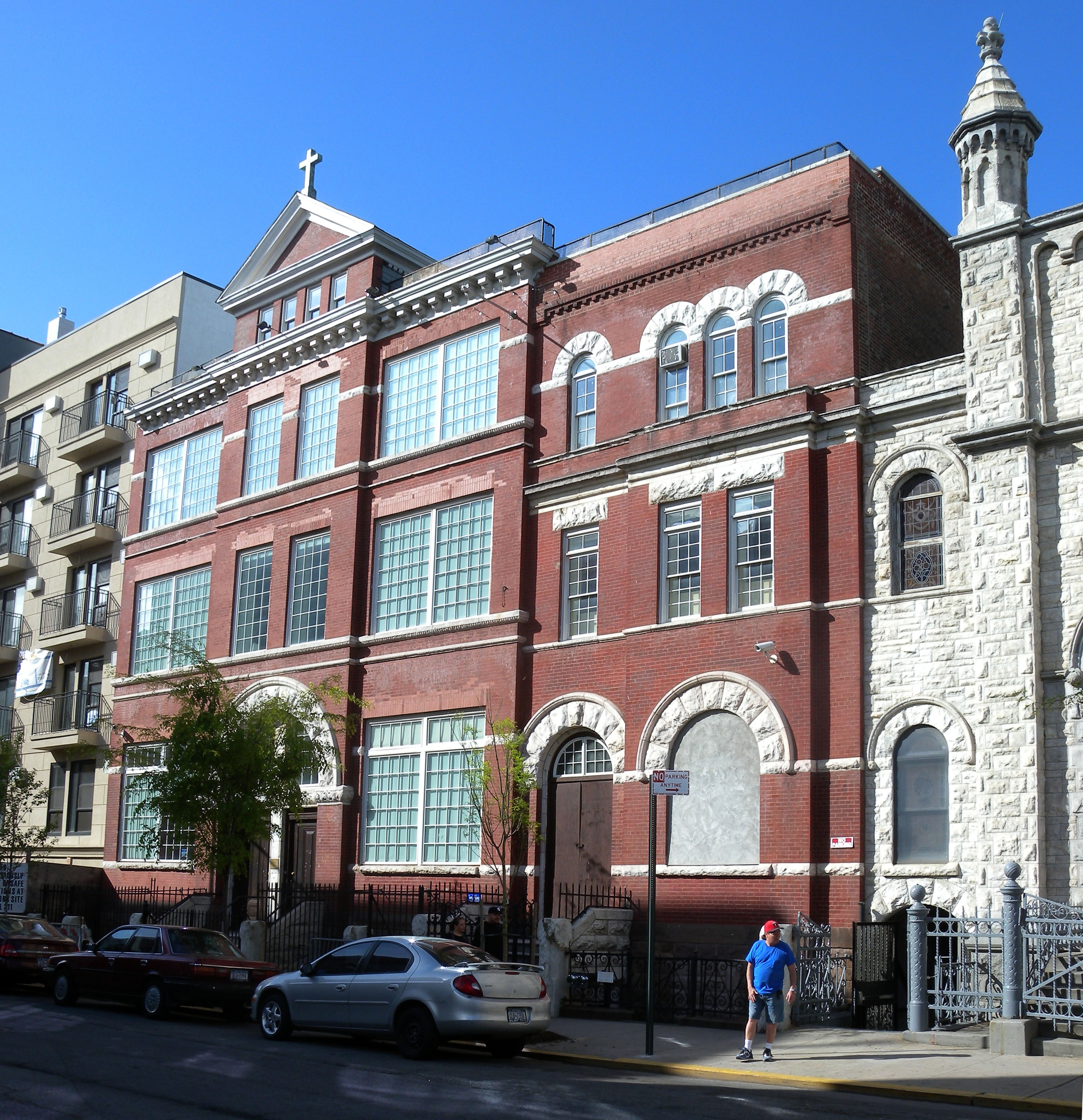
- Former location in East Harlem

- Location within Washington, D.C.
- Established: 1995
- Location: Washington, D.C.
- Coordinates: 38.90557°N 77.039029°W
- Public transit access: Farragut North
- Website: www.nmcal.org

The National Museum of Catholic Art and History is a museum in Washington, D.C., focusing on Catholic art. It was formerly located in East Harlem, Manhattan, New York City. It was founded by Christina Cox in 1995.

== History ==
Cox opened the first Catholic museum in the United States after receiving a standard blessing from then-Pope John Paul II. The museum has received support from the Archdiocese of New York although there is no connection between the two. Following controversy regarding the museum's status as a charity and its collection of funds, the archdiocese sought unsuccessfully to have the word "Catholic" removed from the museum's name.

The museum's collection aims to cover the many facets of Catholic art, although in 2003 Joseph Berger wrote that it lacked a unifying theme, relying instead on donated works.

The museum's original location was in the Olympic Towers on Fifth Avenue, near St. Patrick's Cathedral, a location that allowed the museum to take advantage of Christmas celebrations in the neighborhood. The museum moved several times, including to locations near Radio City Music Hall. In 2002, faced with increasing rents, the museum moved to E. 115th Street, the former home of Our Lady of Mount Carmel Shrine which had recently been spared significant damage from a fire. The museum received around four million dollars in grants from New York State, in the hopes that it would help revitalize East Harlem.

The museum was credited with helping to shape and develop the so-called "new Harlem" that was evolving as a result of increased money and the gentrification of the neighborhood. Following an $8 million renovation, the museum also planned an exhibit on the history of East Harlem, acknowledging the role of the church that housed it in the formerly Italian neighborhood that is now known as Spanish Harlem.

The museum announced on 17 May 2010 that it was closing, and hoped to move to Washington, D.C. On January 27, 2012 the museum filed Chapter 7 bankruptcy (liquidation) in the Southern District of New York as case number 12-10331. The Voluntary Petition listed assets of less than $50,000 and liabilities of $1 million to $10 million.

In 2012 the museum began moving to its new location on Massachusetts Avenue in Washington D.C. Since 2011, it has solicited contributions to re-open As of June 2024 the museum has not re-opened or announced a date for re-opening.

== See also ==
- History of Roman Catholicism in the United States
- Roman Catholicism in the United States
