= National Catholic Welfare Council =

Defunct American Catholic organization

The National Catholic Welfare Council (NCWC) was the annual meeting of the American Catholic episcopacy and its standing secretariat; it was established in 1919 as the successor to an emergency wartime organization, the National Catholic War Council. It consisted of a staff of clergy as well as committees of bishops who discussed and sometimes issued statements on matters of national policy such as education, welfare, and health care. Its successor is the United States Conference of Catholic Bishops.

== History ==
=== National Catholic War Council ===
In order to better address challenges posed by World War I, the American Catholic hierarchy in 1917 chose to meet collectively for the first time since 1884. In June, two months after America's entry into the European war, Paulist Father and Catholic World editor John J. Burke, Catholic University sociology professor William Kerby, Paulist Father Lewis O'Hern, and the former Secretary of Labor, Charles P. Neill , met in Washington, D.C. to formulate an official Catholic response to the war.

As the group's spokesman, Burke consulted with Cardinal James Gibbons of Baltimore, who approved an August meeting of the hierarchy. Representatives from sixty-eight dioceses and twenty-seven Catholic societies met at the Catholic University of America and formed the National Catholic War Council, "to study, coordinate, unify and put in operation all Catholic activities incidental to the war." An executive committee, chaired by Cardinal George Mundelein of Chicago, was formed in December 1917, to oversee the work of the Council.

=== Formation ===
After World War I ended, Burke and Gibbons led a campaign to establish a permanent bishops' council. The issue of prohibition and the threat of federalization of education necessitated a united Catholic response that only an episcopal conference could provide. Thus, on 24 September 1919, ninety-five prelates from eighty-seven of the country's one hundred dioceses came together at The Catholic University; the result was the formation of the National Catholic Welfare Council.

Archbishop Edward Hanna of San Francisco was elected as the first chairman; he continued as chairman through his retirement in 1935. As chairman, he was responsible for coordinating the American bishops' lobbying efforts and response to the domestic and foreign policies of the government.

The Council created five departments: Education, Legislation, Social Action, Lay Organizations, and Press and Publicity, each headed by a bishop. John Burke was appointed general secretary and Archbishop Hanna was elected to chair an administrative committee whose task he described thus: "The Executive Department has to deal directly with the United States government and its numerous departments on matters that affect Catholic interests."

=== NCWC Bureau of Immigration ===
In 1920, the National Catholic Welfare Council established a Bureau of Immigration to assist immigrants in getting established in the United States. The Bureau launched a port assistance program that met incoming ships, helped immigrants through the immigration process and provided loans to them. The bishops, priests, and laymen and women of the National Catholic Welfare Conference (NCWC) became some of the most outspoken critics of US immigration.

=== Threat of suppression ===
Pope Benedict XV died on January 22, 1922. Cardinals O'Connell and Dougherty arrived in Rome on February 6, only to learn that a new pope had been elected only a half-hour before. As Dougherty was leaving Rome, he was handed a decree of the Consistorial Congregation, signed by Cardinal Gaetano de Lai, one of O'Connell's friends, and dated February 25. It ordered the immediate disbanding of the NCWC.

In response, the members of the administrative committee of the NCWC immediately petitioned Pope Pius XI to delay publication of the decree until they could make a representation in Rome. With the permission of Cardinal Pietro Gasparri, the Cardinal Secretary of State, they then delegated Bishop Joseph Schrembs of Cleveland to take the case personally to Rome. Next, they circularized the trustees of the Catholic University of America and then the entire American hierarchy to support a petition to save the NCWC.

Bishop Louis Sebastian Walsh of Portland, Maine, a member of the administrative board, saw in the Consistorial Congregation's action "a dangerous underhand blow from Boston, aided by Philadelphia, who both realized at our last meeting that they could not control the Bishops of this country and they secured the two chief powers of the Consistorial Congregation, Cardinals De Lai and Del Val [sic] to suppress all common action." Walsh hoped to enlist the support of Archbishops Curley of Baltimore and Hayes of New York in the effort to ward off the order to disband.

As O'Connell told Cardinal De Lai, he regarded this circularizing of the bishops as a "plebiscite" designed "to annul the force of the decree. The customary maneuver demonstrates again more evidently the wisdom of the decree. Today we are in full 'Democracy, Presbyterianism, and Congregationalism.'"

And now it seems more than ever that this N.C.W.C. shows more clearly that not only does it tend little by little to weaken hierarchical authority and dignity, but also wishes to put into operation the same tactics against the Consistorial [Congregation]. It is incredible that Rome does not see the danger of conceding today in order to have to concede much more tomorrow.

In Rome, the American delegation learned that the Consistorial Congregation was inclined to accept the attacks of O'Connell and Dougherty against the NCWC because of a concern about a resurgence of Americanism and an anxiety regarding the implications of such a large hierarchy meeting on an annual basis. The Consistorial Congregation's decree, moreover, reflected tension between Gasparri, who was supporting the Americans, and those cardinals who wanted a return to the policies of Pope Pius X. Ultimately, the American delegation won the day. On July 4, 1922, the Consistorial Congregation issued a new instruction: the NCWC could remain in existence, but the congregation recommended, among other things, that the meetings of the hierarchy take place less often than every year, that attendance at them be made voluntary, that decisions of the meetings not be binding or construed in any way as emanating from a plenary council, and that the name "council" in the title be changed to something like "committee."

=== National Catholic Welfare Conference ===
In compliance with the Consistorial Congregation's instructions, the administrative board of the NCWC voted to change the name from "council" to "conference." The National Catholic Welfare Conference was used interchangeably to denote three entities: the administrative board (the term "committee" was also used), the standing secretariat with its departments, and the annual meetings of the hierarchy.

Due to the disparate natures of these three entities, there was an inherent ambiguity with respect to the role that the organization played. On the one hand, it served in a merely consultative role with respect to individual bishops and the Holy See. On the other, it was perceived by the government and the public at large as the official voice of the American bishops. As a result, there was often confusion both within American society and within the church hierarchy regarding the organization's function and official status.

== Organization ==
=== Administrative Committee ===
The Administrative Committee was organized into five departments:

- Department of Education, which safeguarded the interests of Catholic education
- Department of Press, Publicity, and Literature, which had charge of the news service and issues the N.C.W.C. weekly news sheet to 3 dailies and 84 weeklies
- Department of Social Action, which deals with industrial relations, civic education, social welfare, and rural life
- Department of Laws and Legislation, which protected Catholic interests in state and nation
- Department of Lay Organization, which endeavored to organize Catholic men and women

== Current status ==
The National Catholic Welfare Conference later split into the National Conference of Catholic Bishops (NCCB) and the United States Catholic Conference (USCC). Today it is the United States Conference of Catholic Bishops (USCCB) after both entities were reunified in 2001.

== See also ==
- Catholic News Service
- Mazie E. Clemens, journalist, special representative of the NCWC during World War I
