= History of the Catholic Church in Florida =

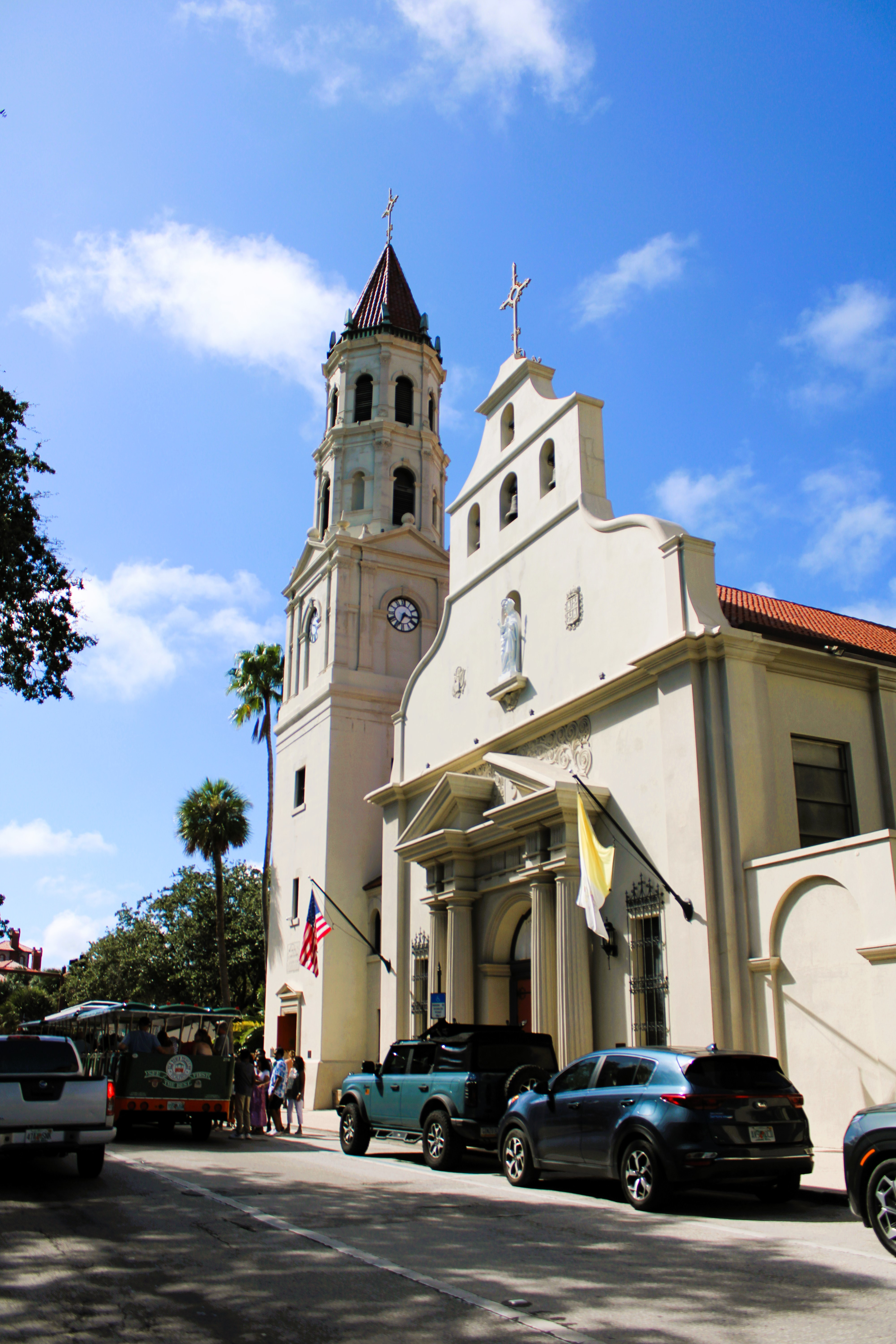
Cathedral Basilica of St. Augustine (2024)

The history of the Catholic Church in Florida began in the early 1500s with the arrival of Spanish explorers and missionaries in the present-day State of Florida in the United States. After Spanish explorers spent several decades warring with the Native American tribes, Spanish Franciscan missionaries succeeded in converting thousands of natives to Catholicism through an extensive network of missions in Northern and Central Florida. However, during the 1700s this native population was severely decimated by disease and raids from the English colonies to the north.

After the Florida missions closed, the remaining Spanish and native Catholic populations retreated to St. Augustine, their main stronghold in Spanish Florida. However, when the English took control of the colony in 1763, the entire population relocated to Cuba. Spain regained control of Florida from England in 1784, but the population of the colony was now non-Catholic. When Florida was ceded to the United States in 1821, the Catholic population of Florida was still small.

The first diocese in Florida was the Diocese of St. Augustine, founded in 1870. After its founding, the diocese started recruiting more priests and establishing more parishes throughout the state. It sent the Jesuit order into the southern half of Florida to found parishes and Catholic institutions in the growing cities and towns there. After World War II, the Catholic population of Florida started to increase dramatically. The Vatican established new dioceses in Miami, St. Petersburg, Orlando, Palm Beach, Venice, and Pensacola-Tallahassee. The Diocese of Miami was elevated into an archdiocese.

As the Catholic Church has dealt with the sexual abuse scandals in the late 20th and early 21st centuries, two bishops of the Diocese of Palm Beach resigned after they admitted to sexually abusing minors in other states. A 2018 state investigation found no evidence that the Florida dioceses had suppressed or ignored credible accusations of sexual abuse.

== 16th century – 17th century ==
=== 1500 to 1550 ===
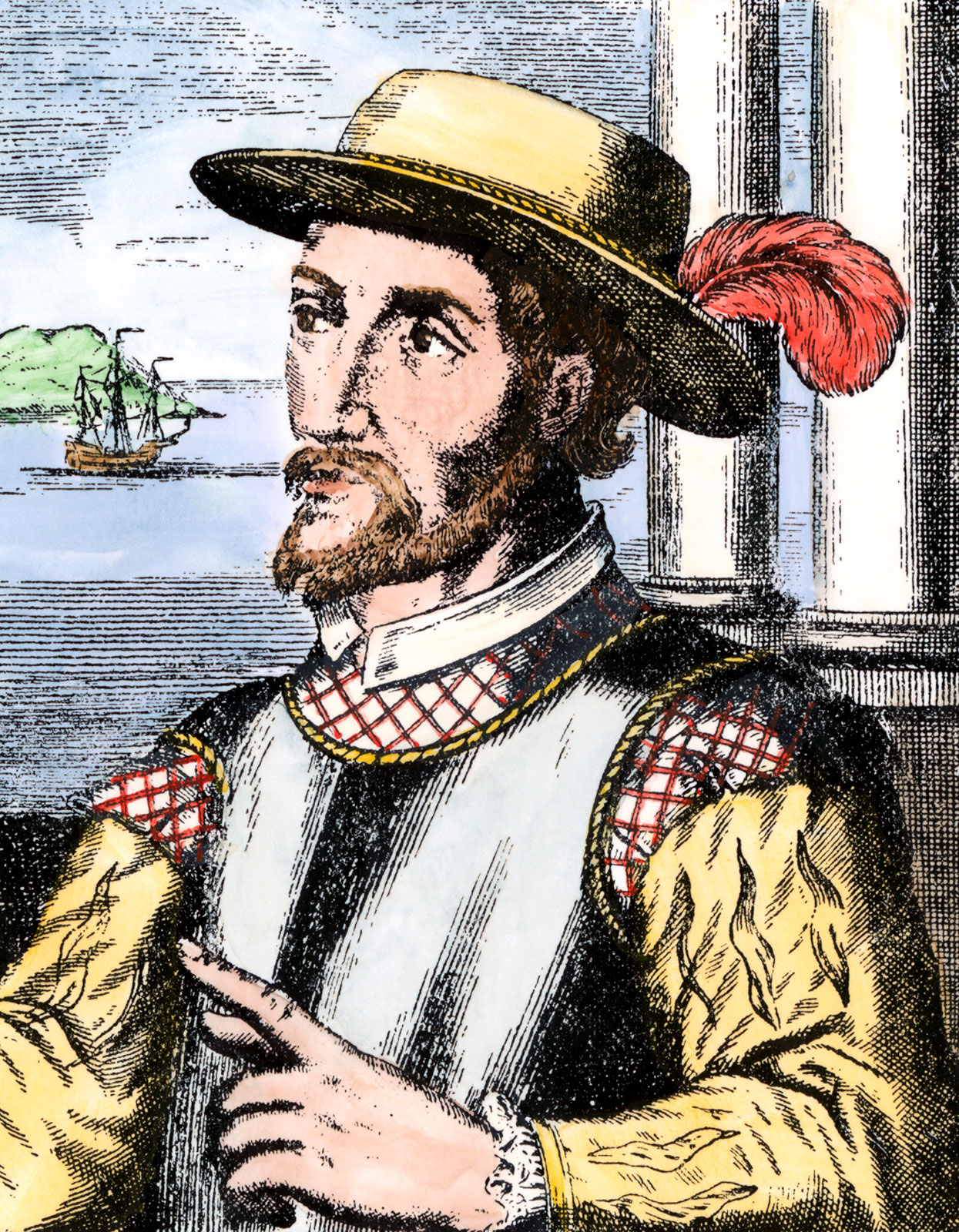
Juan Ponce de León

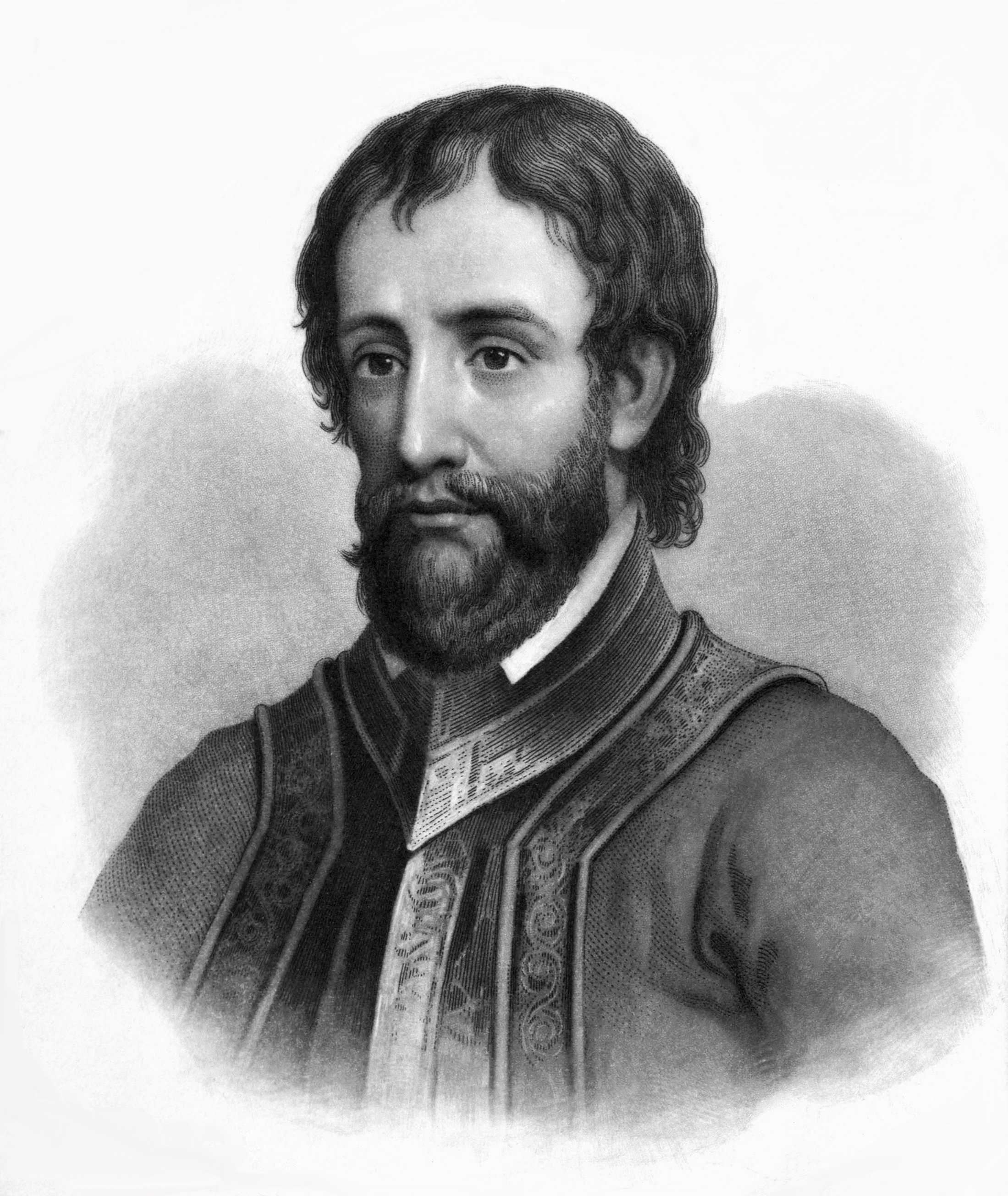
Hernando De Soto (pre-1858)

The first documented Catholic presence in present-day Florida was that of the expedition of the Spanish explorer Juan Ponce de León, who explored the east and west coasts of Florida in 1513. He called the new land "La Florida". When the Spanish landed on the Gulf Coast of Florida, they discovered that the Calusa, the dominant indigenous people of the area, possessed gold jewelry and other items. Despite Spanish efforts to peacefully trade for the gold, the Calusa attacked the ships, prompting Ponce de León to sail away.

Convinced that Florida contained sizable amounts of gold, De Leon sailed from Puerto Rico with a colonizing expedition in 1521, landing near either Charlotte Harbor or the mouth of the Caloosahatchee River. His two ships carried 200 men, including priests, farmers and artisans. However, before Ponce de León could establish a settlement, the Calusa again attacked the Spanish. Ponce de León was mortally wounded in the battle. The expedition then returned to Puerto Rico.

In 1528, Pánfilo de Narváez and his expedition landed at what is known as the Jungle Prada Site in present-day St. Petersburg. A contingent of Franciscan and diocesan priests led by Padre Juan Suárez (sometimes spelled Xuárez) also participated in this expedition.

In 1539, the Spanish explorer Hernando De Soto, leading an expedition of 10 ships and 620 men, landed near present-day Port Charlotte or San Carlos Bay in La Florida. He named the new territory "La Bahia de Espiritu Santo," in honor of the Holy Spirit. His company included 12 priests, there to evangelize the Native Americans. According to contemporary accounts, the priests celebrated mass almost every day. However, De Soto was looking to find gold and take slaves, not establish missions. Faced with such a large expedition, the Calusa evacuated their settlements near De Soto's landing. The expedition proceeded north on the Florida Peninsula, fighting different tribes, burning their villages and enslaving their inhabitants.

The expeditions of Pánfilo de Narváez in 1528 and Hernando de Soto in 1539 both visited Pensacola Bay, the latter of which documented the name "Bay of Ochuse".

Looking to establish missions, the Spanish Dominican priest Luis de Cáncer in 1549 arrived by sea in La Florida with several other Dominican in present-day Bradenton. Encountering a seemingly peaceful party of Tocobaga clan members, the priests decided to travel on to Tampa Bay to the Tocobaga village. Several of the priests went overland with the Tocobaga while Cáncer and the remaining party sailed to Tampa Bay to meet them. Arriving at Tampa Bay, Cáncer learned, while still on board his ship, that the Tocobaga had murdered the other priests. Ignoring advice from his companions, Cáncer went ashore alone to meet with the Tocobaga, who killed him.

=== 1550 to 1700 ===
Spanish Florida (1803)

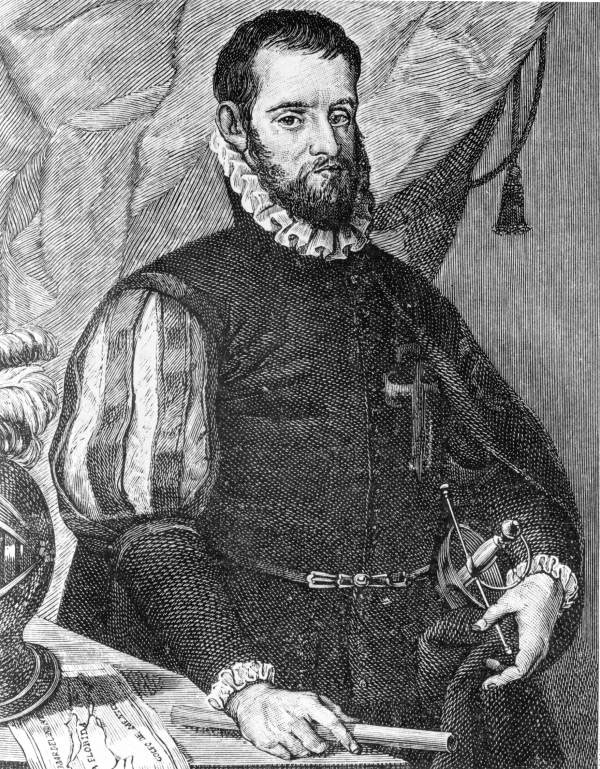
Pedro Menendez de Aviles (pre-1791)

The first Catholics missionaries on the east coast of La Florida were Spanish Jesuits. In 1565, the Spanish explorer Pedro Menéndez de Avilés founded the St. Augustine presidio, or fort, in La Florida. He then built several presidios along the Florida coastline to protect the colony from French and English raids. Priests opened missions at each of these presidios, converting the Native Americans and trading goods for food. De Aviles in 1566 brokered a peace agreement with the Calusa peoples, allowing the construction of a presidio and the San Antón de Carlos mission at Mound Key in present-day Lee County. This became the first Jesuit mission in the present day United States. The Jesuit priests Juan Rogel and Francisco de Villareal spent the winter at San Antón de Carlos studying the Calusa language, then started evangelizing among the Calusa in South Florida.

The Jesuits also established another mission in 1567 on Upper Matecumbe Key in the Florida Keys, but subsequently abandoned it and returned to Spain. That same year, the Jesuits built a chapel at San Antón de Carlos. Conflicts with the Calusa soon increased, prompting de Avilés to leave San Antón de Carlos in 1569. In 1571, after another brief, unsuccessful trip to Northern Florida, the Jesuits abandoned all their missionary efforts in La Florida.

Two years later, in 1573, several Spanish Franciscan missionaries arrived in present-day St. Augustine. They established the Mission Nombre de Dios in 1587 at a village of the Timucuan people. As missionaries started establishing missions in the northern and central parts of La Florida, the Vatican placed them under the ecclesiastical jurisdiction of the Diocese of Santiago de Cuba in Santiago, Cuba.

In 1693, King Charles II of Spain declared that any enslaved people from the English colonies who converted to Catholicism would be free in La Florida. Most of these African-American refugees travelled to St. Augustine, but others reached Pensacola. These Spanish policies eventually prompted slave owners from the English colonies to raid La Florida to recover their former slaves.

== 18th century ==
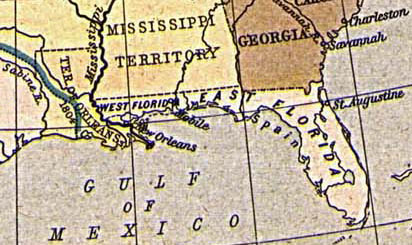
Spanish East and West Florida (1810)

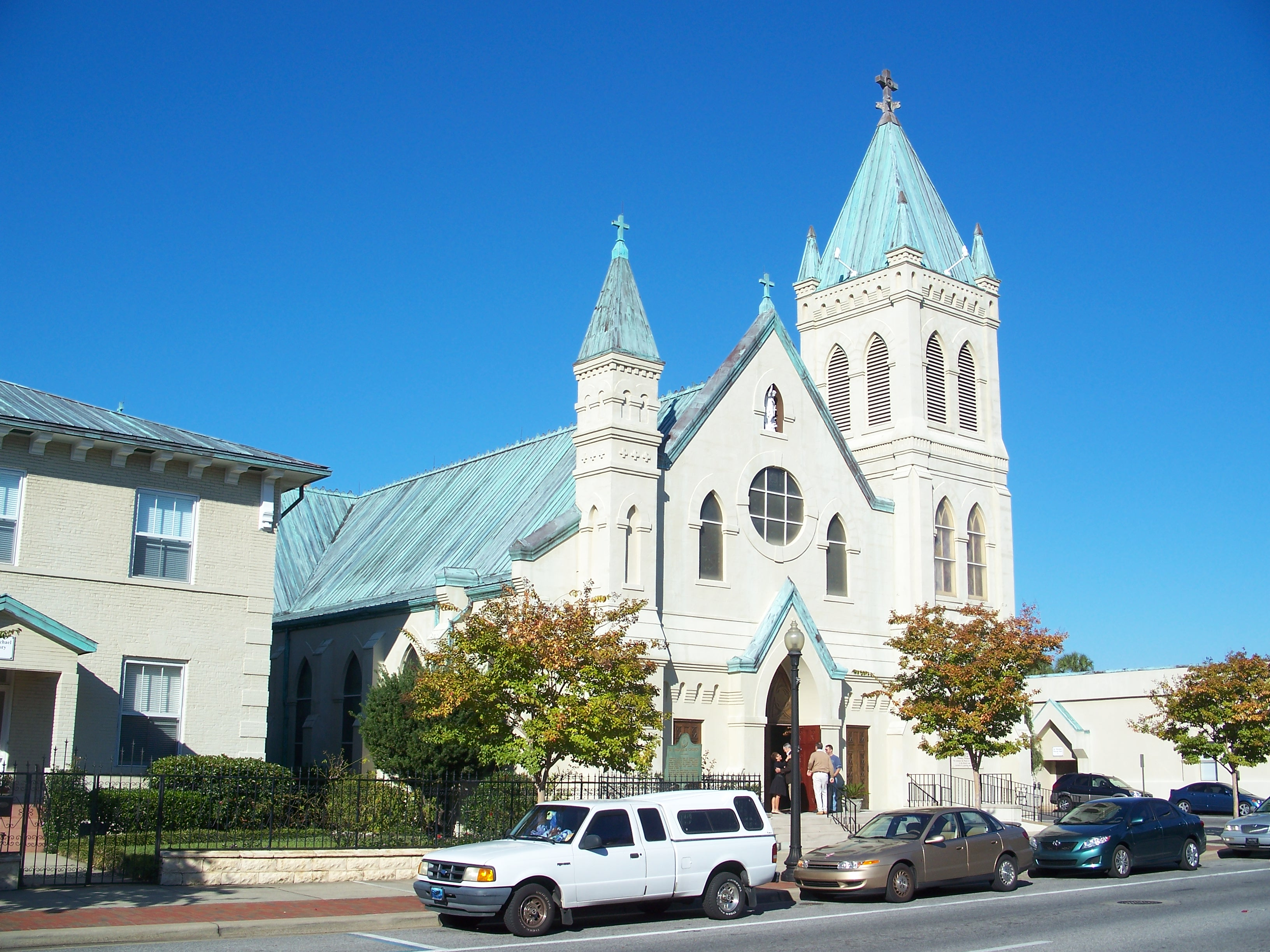
Basilica of St. Michael the Archangel, Pensacola (2010)

By the early 1700s, the Franciscans had established a network of 40 missions in Northern and Central Florida, with 70 priests ministering to over 25,000 Native American converts. These missions included farms and ranches, tended by the native converts, that produced food for La Florida.

However, the native populations in La Florida were already declining, weakened by European diseases. During the Queen Anne's War, raids by English settlers and their Creek Native American allies from the Carolinas totally decimated this population, eventually forcing the Franciscans to close their missions. The Spanish settlers and their converts retreated to St. Augustine and Pensacola.

After the end of the French and Indian War in 1763, Spain ceded all of La Florida to England in exchange for the return of Cuba, which the English had captured in 1762. For ease of administration, the English then divided La Florida into West Florida (the Florida Panhandle) and East Florida (the Florida Peninsula). Despite English promises of religious tolerance towards Catholics in the colonies, the entire population of St. Augustine migrated to Cuba.

In 1781, during the American Revolution, Spain recaptured part of West Florida from the English. They established St. Michael the Archangel Parish that same year in Pensacola. The first Catholic parish in that city, St. Michael is now the Basilica of St. Michael the Archangel.

Spain regained control of all of West and East Florida in 1784 from England as part of the 1783 Treaty of Paris. However, at this time, the population of the Floridas consisted mainly of emancipated slaves, Seminole Native Americans and Loyalist refugees from the new United States, the vast majority of them non-Catholic

The Vatican in 1787 transferred the ecclesiastical jurisdiction of the two Floridas from the Diocese of Santiago de Cuba to the Diocese of San Cristobal de la Habana in Cuba. In 1793, the Vatican again changed the jurisdiction for the Floridas, moving both colonies from Havana to the Diocese of Louisiana and the Two Floridas. This diocese was based in New Orleans, then under the Spanish Province of Louisiana. When the United States acquired Louisiana with the Louisiana Purchase in 1803, New Orleans and the territory came under American control, but Florida in 1806 returned to the Diocese of Havana (until 1823).

== 19th century ==
Bishop Verot (pre-1914)

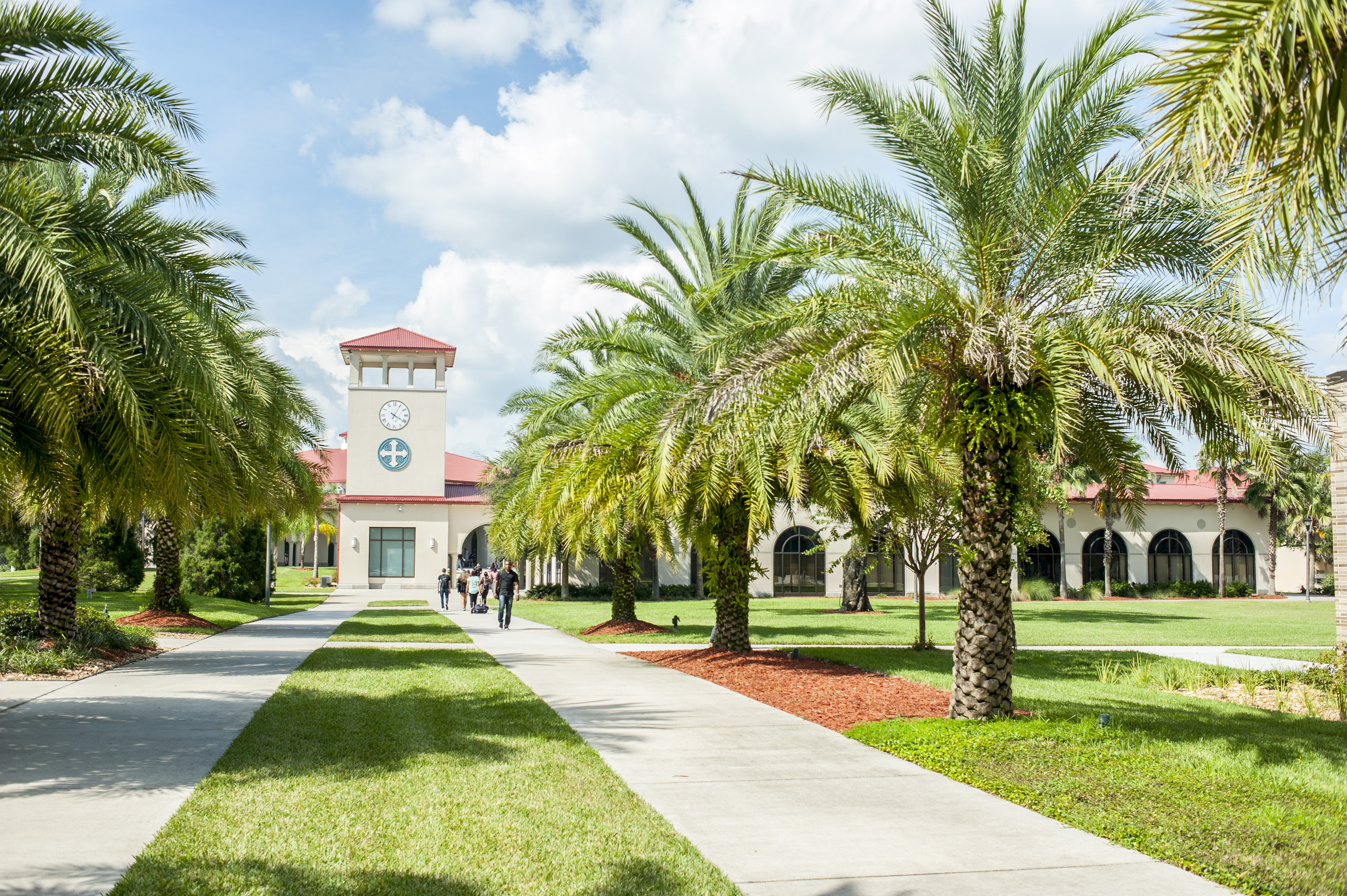
St. Leo University, Tampa (2015)

In the Adams–Onís Treaty of 1819, Spain ceded both East and West Florida to the United States, which then established the Florida Territory in 1821. In 1825, Pope Leo XII erected the Vicariate of Alabama and Florida in Mobile, Alabama. The new vicariate included the few Catholics left in Florida.Pope Pius VIII in 1829 erected the Diocese of Mobile, giving it jurisdiction over the Florida Panhandle. The first Catholic church in Tallahassee, Blessed Sacrament, was dedicated in 1845.

In 1850, Pope Pius IX erected the Diocese of Savannah, which included Georgia and the new State of Florida east of the Apalachicola River. The first Catholic church in Jacksonville, Immaculate Conception, was founded in 1854. It is now the Basilica of Immaculate Conception.

In 1858, Pius IX moved Florida into a new Apostolic Vicariate of Florida and named Bishop Augustin Verot as its vicar apostolic. Since the new vicariate had only three priests, Vérot travelled to France in 1859, where he recruited seven more priests. After the end of the American Civil War in 1865, priest from the vicariate started visiting the southern part of the state.

Verot in 1866 requested that the Sisters of St. Joseph in France sent a contingent of nuns to St. Augustine to found a school for recently emancipated slaves. It later became St. Joseph Academy, now the oldest Catholic high school in the state.In 1870 the Vatican converted the Apostolic Vicariate of Florida into the Diocese of St. Augustine, with Verot as its first bishop. The new diocese covered the entire state. The Immaculate Conception of the Blessed Virgin Mary Mission (later St. Francis Xavier Parish) was erected in Fort Myers in 1878.

The Sisters of the Holy Names of Jesus and Mary founded the Academy of the Holy Names, a girls school in Tampa, in 1881. It was the first Catholic school on the Florida Gulf Coast. That same year, St. James Church was dedicated in Orlando, the first Catholic church in that city. It is now St. James Cathedral. Arizona jurist Edmund F. Dunne established the Catholic colony of San Antonio in Pasco County on the Gulf Coast in the early 1880s. Residence in the town was originally restricted to practicing Catholics, most of whom were Irish and German immigrants.

A yellow fever epidemic in Tampa in 1888 killed three of the priests assigned to southern Florida. To fill the void, Bishop John Moore of St. Augustine in 1889 asked the Society of Jesus to assume jurisdiction over that region and send priests down there. The Jesuits in 1889 established St. Leo University in Tampa, the first Catholic institution of high learning in Florida. Jesuit priests started making regular visits to the region, establishing missions;:

- Sacred Heart in Punta Gorda (1888)
- Sacred Heart in Bradenton (1888)
- St. Martha in Sarasota (1889)

Gesù Church, the first Catholic church in Miami and South Florida, was dedicated in 1896. The Jesuits sent Reverend Conrad Widman to present-day Palm Beach in 1892 to serve as its first priest. He founded St. Ann Parish, the first parish in the area. The land for the church was donated by the developer Henry Flagler. In 1898, St. Paul's Church was dedicated in Daytona Beach, the first Catholic church in that community.

== 20th century ==
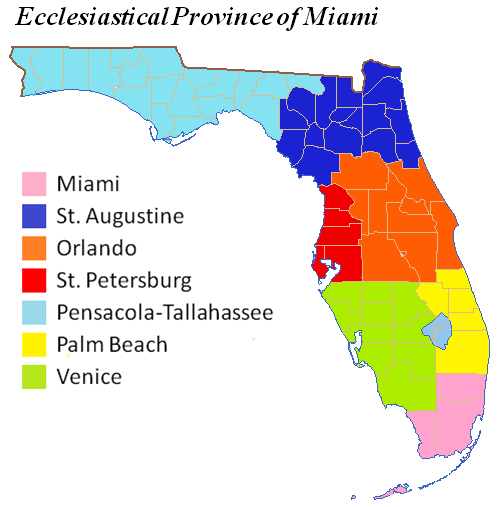
Dioceses in Florida

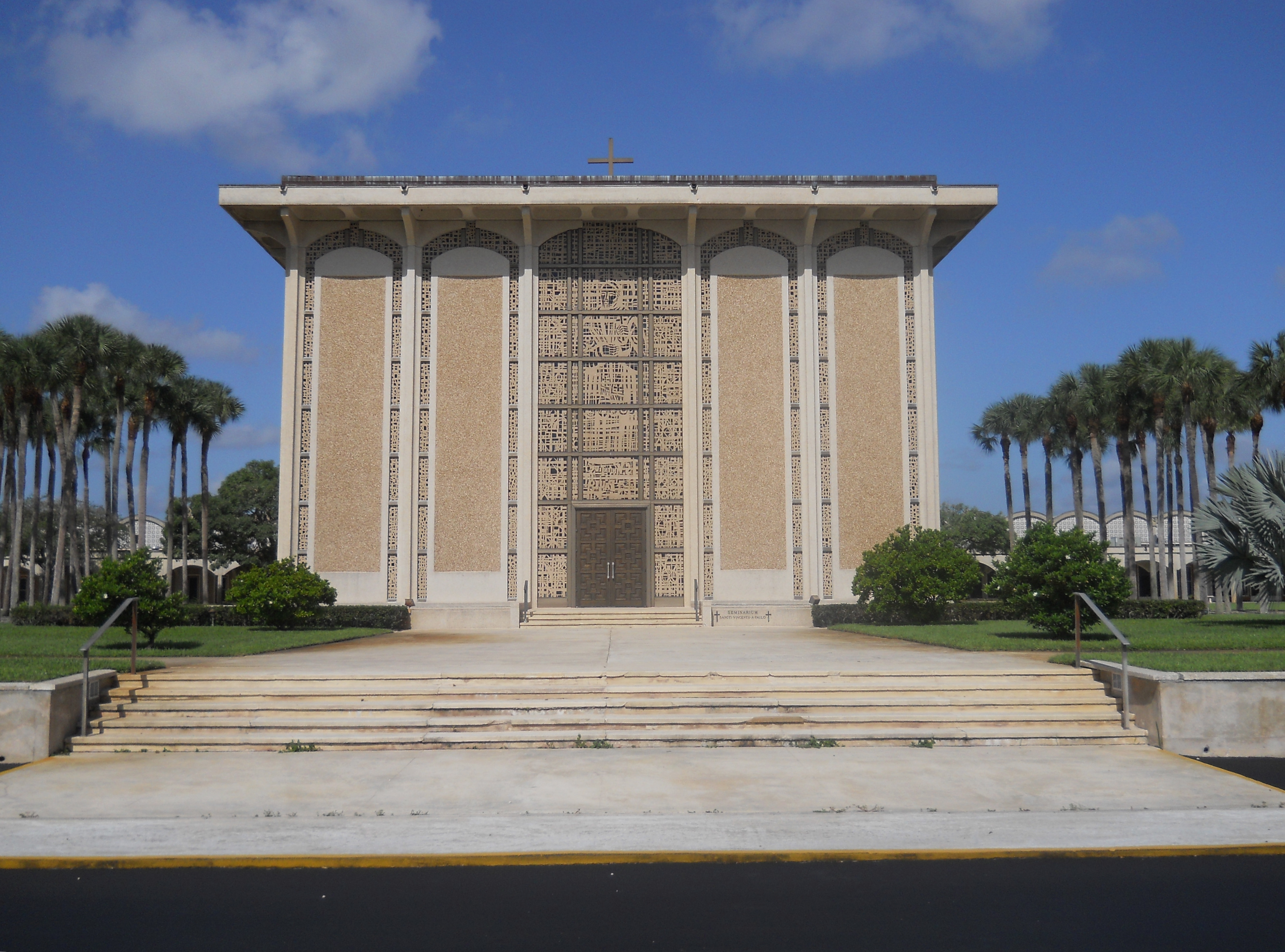
St. Vincent de Paul Regional Seminary, Boynton Beach (2011)

Saint Mary, Our Lady of Grace, founded in 1908, was the first Catholic parish in St. Petersburg. The first Catholic church in Homestead was Sacred Heart, constructed in 1917. The first Catholic church in Brevard County was St. Joseph, dedicated in 1914. The first Catholic hospital in Florida, Pensacola Hospital, was opened by the Daughters of Charity in Pensacola in 1915.Today it is . The Daughters of Charity established St. Vincent Hospital in Jacksonville the next year.It is today St. Vincent's Medical Center Riverside. In Clearwater, the first Catholic church was St. Cecilia, dedicated in 1924.

In 1940, Bishop Patrick Barry of St. Augustine and his sister, Reverend Mother M. Gerald Barry, prioress general of the Dominican Sisters of Adrian, Michigan, opened Barry College for women in Miami Shores. It is today Barry University.

After World War II, Bishop Joseph P. Hurley of St. Augustine started purchasing property throughout Florida to develop new parishes for the increasing Catholic population. He also recruited priests from the Northern United States and Ireland to serve in Florida. St. Ann's, the first parish in Naples, opened in 1950.That same year, the Sisters of St. Joseph of St. Augustine opened Mercy Hospital in Miami. It is today HCA Florida Mercy Hospital.

Pope Pius XII erected the Diocese of Miami in 1958. At the direction of the Vatican, the new bishop of Miami, Coleman Carroll, established a minor seminary, St. John Vianney Seminary, in Westchester in 1959. It is today the St. John Vianney College Seminary and Graduate School. That same year, the Cuban Revolution triggered a wave of Cuban immigration to South Florida, increasing the Catholic population in the region. Several Augustinian priests who were deported from Cuba founded Biscayne College in Miami in 1961. The Archdiocese of Miami assumed operation of Biscayne College in 1988, when it became St. Thomas University.

During the early 1960s, Carroll ended all racial segregation in the schools operated by the Diocese of Miami. He was first bishop in Florida to take that action. Carroll in 1963 invited the Vicentian religious order to establish a major seminary in Boynton Beach. Today, St. Vincent de Paul Regional Seminary is the only theologate in the Southeastern United States, serving all of the Catholic dioceses in Florida as well as other states.

As the Catholic population grew in Florida during the second half of the 20th century, the Vatican erected more dioceses in the state. In 1968, Pope Paul VI erected the Dioceses of St. Petersburg and Orlando. At the same time, the pope elevated the Diocese of Miami to the Archdiocese of Miami. Paul VI erected the Diocese of Pensacola-Tallahassee in 1975. The Diocese of Venice in Florida was erected by Pope John Paul II in 1984. Recognizing the growth of the Catholic Church in Florida, John Paul II visited Miami in 1987, where he celebrated a mass. It was the first papal visit to the state.

In April 1998, a man informed Archbishop John C. Favalora of Miami that Bishop Joseph Keith Symons of Palm Beach, had sexually abused him when he was an altar server decades earlier. When confronted about the allegations, Symons admitted his guilt. The Vatican immediately asked Bishop Robert N. Lynch of St. Petersburg to go to Palm Beach to hear Symons' confession. During that session, Symons admitted that he had abused four other boys. According to Lynch, the molestations did not take place in Florida. In June 1998, Lynch announced that John Paul II had accepted Symons' resignation as bishop of Palm Beach.

== 21st century ==
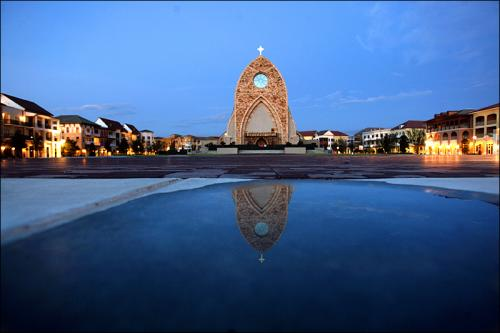
Ave Maria Church, Ave Maria (2008)

On March 8, 2002, Bishop Anthony O'Connell of Palm Beach admitted that he had molested at least two students of St. Thomas Aquinas Preparatory Seminary in Hannibal, Missouri, during his early service there. That same day, O'Connell offered his resignation as bishop of Palm Beach to the Vatican. It was accepted by John Paul II five days later.

During the early 2000s, the Jesuits started divesting themselves from operating parishes in Florida, many of which they had founded in the late 1800s. This was due to the shrinking number of priests in the order.

In 2007, Tom Monaghan, the founder of Domino's Pizza, opened Ave Maria University in the new town of Ave Maria.

With substantial immigration of predominantly Catholic South and Central Americans to the South Florida area, the Catholic population of the region reached 25% in the early 2000s. Waves of immigrants from Asia and Africa led to priests celebrating mass in over a dozen different languages.

The Office of Statewide Prosecution, part of the Florida Attorney General Office, in late 2018 launched an investigation into sexual abuse allegations by minors against priests in Florida. The investigation had been prompted by the Pennsylvania Grand Jury report in August 2018 that showed coverups of sexual abuse by bishops in that state. The Florida report, released in 2020, "found no evidence of ongoing, unreported, current sexual abuse of minors by church priests in Florida." The report listed 97 priests in Florida with historical accusations of sexual abuse.

As of 2024, the Florida Conference of Catholic Bishops estimated the Catholic population of the state to exceed 1,900,000, served by 1,175 priests in 472 parishes and 51 missions.

== See also ==
- Ecclesiastical Province of Miami
- Archdiocese of Miami
- Diocese of Orlando
- Diocese of Palm Beach
- Diocese of Pensacola-Tallahassee
- Diocese of Venice
