= John J. Burke =

American priest (1875–1936)

John J. Burke (June 6, 1875 in New York City–1936) was a Paulist priest and editor of the Catholic World from 1903 to 1922.

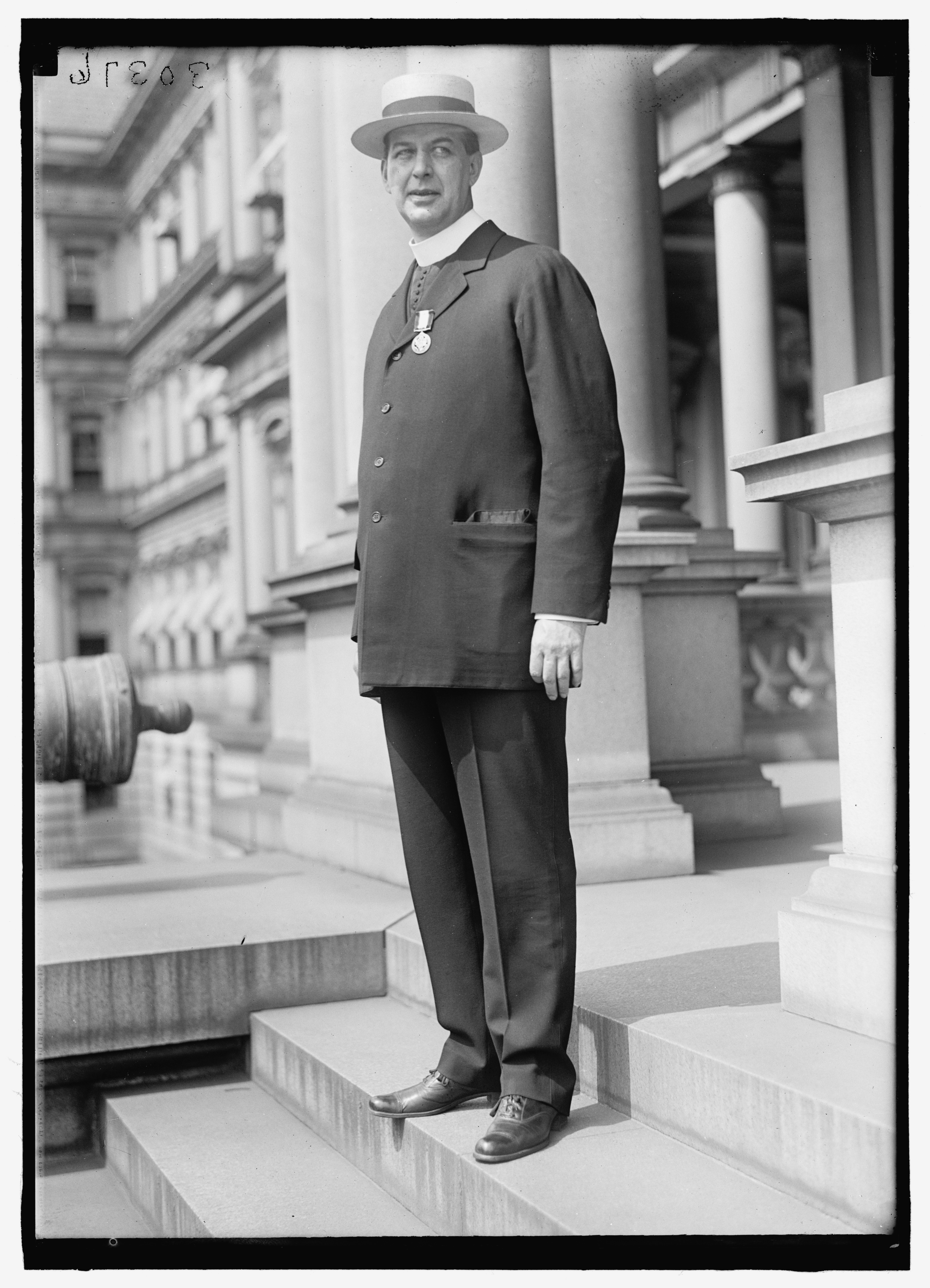

A central point of Burke's writing and lecturing concerned the supernatural element of charity. Burke told the 1915 graduating class of New York's College of Mount Saint Vincent-on-Hudson that, for two millennia, the Church has pursued as her "one great purpose" to lead souls to the love of God. "Whatever other claims she makes as to her mission," he insisted, "are at best but secondary."

Burke warned Catholics about the modern superstition that "experts in the social sciences might well be trusted with our social betterment," a view that encouraged the trend towards making of religion "a private and an almost secret matter."

== National Catholic War Council ==
Burke was the main force behind the creation of the National Catholic War Council. Burke had long argued for a national outlook and sense of unity among the country's Catholics. In 1917, with the backing of Cardinal James Gibbons and other bishops, Burke called for a meeting of Catholic representatives from across the country at Catholic University to establish a National Catholic War Council.

Burke was awarded the Distinguished Service Medal by the U.S. War Department for his service as chairman of the Committee on Special War Activities (CSWA) of the National Catholic War Council.

When the National Catholic Welfare Council superseded the National Catholic War Council, Burke was appointed its general secretary.

== Cristero War ==
In 1929, Archbishop Pietro Fumasoni-Biondi, apostolic delegate to the United States, named Burke his agent in matters pertaining to the Mexican religious conflict known as the Cristero War. Burke worked closely with Dwight Whitney Morrow, the US ambassador to Mexico, to broker an end to the conflict.
