= 2024 Democratic National Convention =

- 2024 presidential election

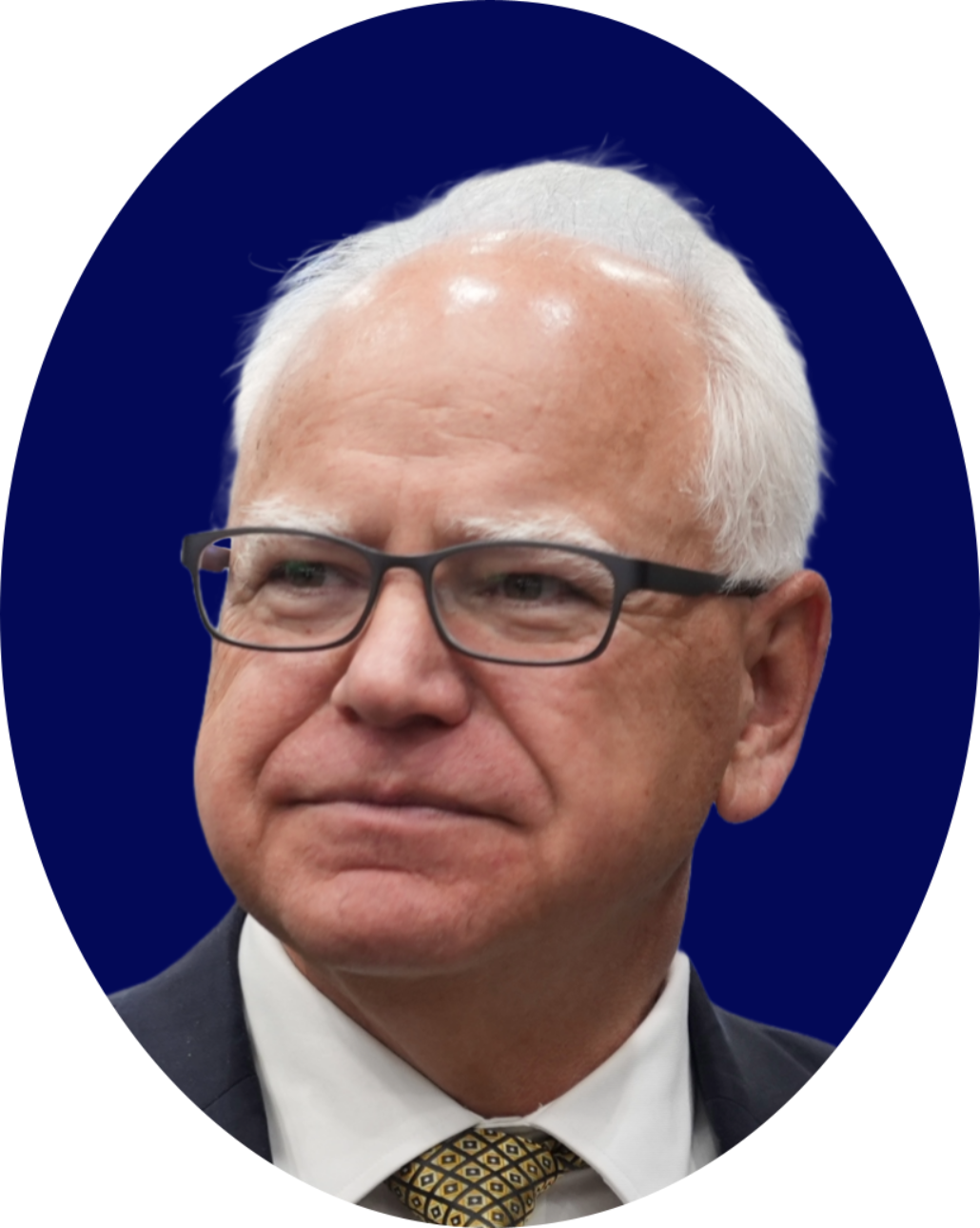
- Nominees; Harris and Walz

Convention
- Dates: August 19–22, 2024
- City: Chicago, Illinois
- Venue: United Center
- Chair: Minyon Moore
- Keynote speaker: Angela Alsobrooks of Maryland
- Notable speakers: List: Joe Biden Andy Beshear Jill Biden Pete Buttigieg Jason Carter Bill Clinton Hillary Clinton Jim Clyburn Tammy Duckworth Geoff Duncan Doug Emhoff Shawn Fain Peggy Flanagan Maxwell Frost John Giles Stephanie Grisham Kathy Hochul Hakeem Jeffries Brandon Johnson Steve Kerr Stephen Curry Adam Kinzinger Ana Navarro Barack Obama Michelle Obama Alexandria Ocasio-Cortez Nancy Pelosi J. B. Pritzker Jamie Raskin Bernie Sanders Chuck Schumer Josh Shapiro Raphael Warnock Oprah Winfrey Gretchen Whitmer

Candidates
- Presidential nominee: Kamala Harris of California
- Vice-presidential nominee: Tim Walz of Minnesota

Voting
- Total delegates: 3,949 pledged 746 unpledged (Note: Unpledged delegates were permitted by the DNC's new early virtual nomination rules to vote on the first ballot at the convention, as Harris already obtained the non-binding endorsement of a majority of the uncommitted delegates that had previously been Biden's pledged delegates.)
- Votes needed for nomination: 1,975 (from pledged delegates only)
- Results (president): Harris (CA): 4,567 (97.27%); Present: 52 (1.10%); Abstention: 76 (1.63%)
- Results (vice president): Walz (MN): Acclamation
- Ballots: 1

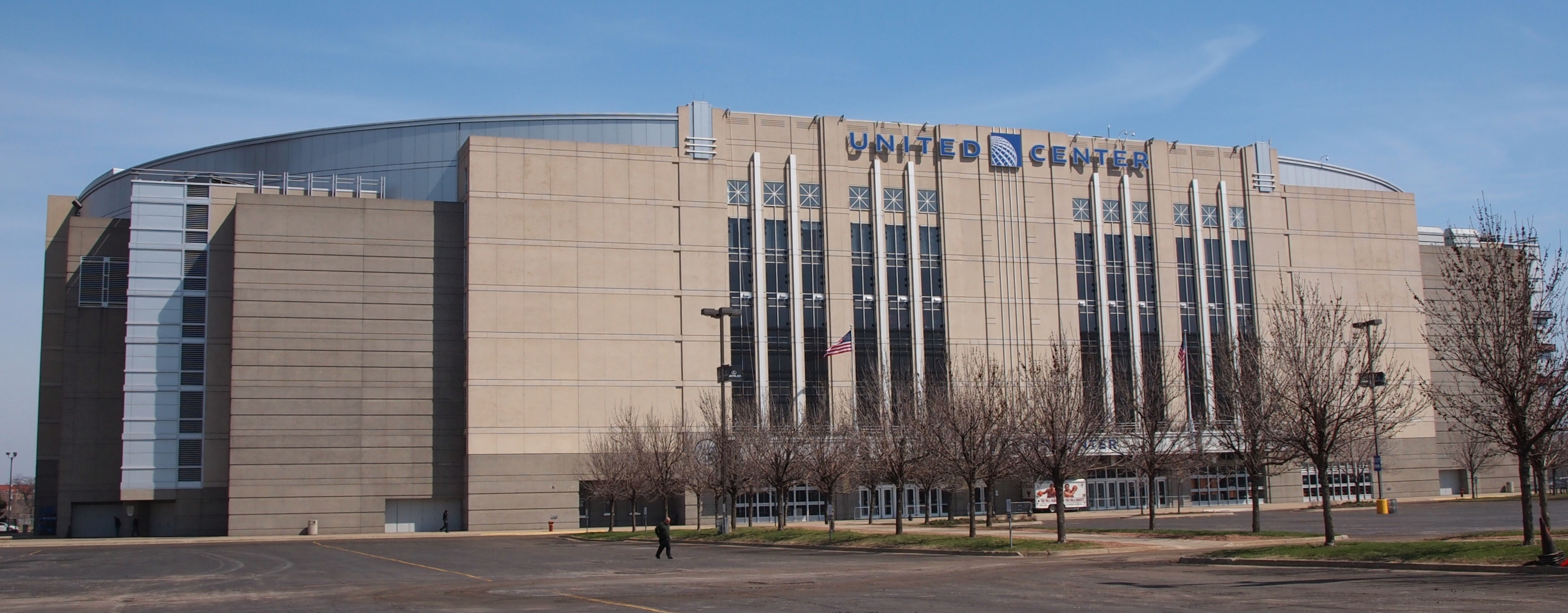
United Center, the convention venue (photographed in 2014)

The 2024 Democratic National Convention was a United States presidential nominating convention in which delegates of the United States Democratic Party voted on their party platform and ceremonially reported their vote to nominate Vice President Kamala Harris for president and her chosen running mate Governor Tim Walz of Minnesota for vice president in the 2024 United States presidential election. It was held from August 19 to 22, 2024, at the United Center in Chicago, Illinois. Delegates virtually nominated Harris and Walz the first week of August. Harris is the first Black woman and first Indian woman to be the presidential nominee of a major political party in the United States, and the first Democratic presidential nominee from the Western United States. (Note: Although Barack Obama was born and raised in Hawaii, he would later reside in Illinois, where his political career would take place.)

Earlier, on March 12, incumbent President Joe Biden became the party's presumptive nominee, running against several candidates, which included an incumbent Democratic member of the United States House of Representatives during the 2024 Democratic Party presidential primaries. Other than Biden, the only presidential candidates who were awarded pledged delegates to the 2024 Democratic National Convention based on the results of the primaries were U.S. Representative Dean Phillips of Minnesota and businessman Jason Palmer. Conflicts with ballot deadlines led the Democratic National Committee to vote on June 20 to allow an early online nomination vote. Following the 2024 Joe Biden–Donald Trump presidential debate and the withdrawal of Joe Biden from the 2024 United States presidential election, Biden immediately endorsed the Kamala Harris 2024 presidential campaign. And though Biden had endorsed Harris as the new candidate at the top of the ticket, there was no obligation for the delegates to follow suit. With the other most viable presidential prospects endorsing Harris, she secured the non-binding support of enough convention delegates to make her the new presumptive nominee the next day, and Harris was the only candidate with enough delegate support to be on the ballot for the virtual roll call. The atypical circumstances were described by The New York Times as starting a campaign "unlike any in modern times". Throughout the fourth and final night, Beyoncé and others were heavily rumored to make an unannounced appearance, leading to rampant speculation on social media that ultimately failed to materialize. Some delegates after the convention said that they tested positive for COVID-19 due to so many people being at the convention. Throughout the convention, protests over the Gaza war took place, including from the Uncommitted National Movement.

Harris and Walz would go on to lose the 2024 election to the Republican Party ticket of former President Donald Trump and Ohio Senator JD Vance, losing all seven battleground states.

== Site selection ==
=== Early developments ===
The preceding 2020 Democratic National Convention had been downsized due to the impacts of the COVID-19 pandemic, which resulted in the convention being held in various parts of the United States, including its main host city of Milwaukee, Wisconsin, in a virtual format. Amid this downsizing, discussion emerged among some notable individuals in Milwaukee about the city pushing to receive the 2024 convention as consolation for losing out on the economic benefits that a full-scale 2020 convention had been expected to generate. Speculation existed that, due to the circumstances surrounding the downsizing of the 2020 convention, Milwaukee would be a front-runner to host the convention if it pursued it. Milwaukee mayor Tom Barrett was open to the city hosting either a Democratic or Republican convention in 2024.

In the summer of 2021, Democratic National Committee Chair Jaime Harrison sent letters to over twenty cities inviting them to bid to host the convention.

Officials in Columbus, Ohio, had, since at least 2019, discussed trying to seek either the Democratic or Republican convention in 2024.

After Milwaukee was one of approximately twenty cities that Harrison invited to bid, Barrett wrote Harrison a letter indicating the city's interest in hosting the party's 2024 convention. Milwaukee was also bidding to host the 2024 Republican National Convention. Milwaukee wound up securing the Republican Convention; in August 2022, formally being awarded the Republican convention.

Nashville, Tennessee, took action to pursue either party's Convention.

Top Democrats from Illinois, including Governor J. B. Pritzker, Senator Tammy Duckworth, and Mayor Lori Lightfoot, laid the groundwork to host the convention in Chicago. Chicago has hosted the most major-party presidential nominating conventions of any city (14 Republican, 11 Democratic). The 1968 Democratic National Convention was mired in violence between anti-war demonstrators and the Chicago Police Department. The most recent convention (1996 Democratic National Convention) saw the renomination of Bill Clinton and Al Gore. On May 3, 2022, Chicago launched a website to promote the city as a potential host for the convention. Facilities in Chicago mentioned as potential primary venues include the United Center, Wintrust Arena, and Navy Pier.

In May 2022, Atlanta and New York City also announced bids for the convention. New York City had not previously been expected to bid.

=== Official bid process ===
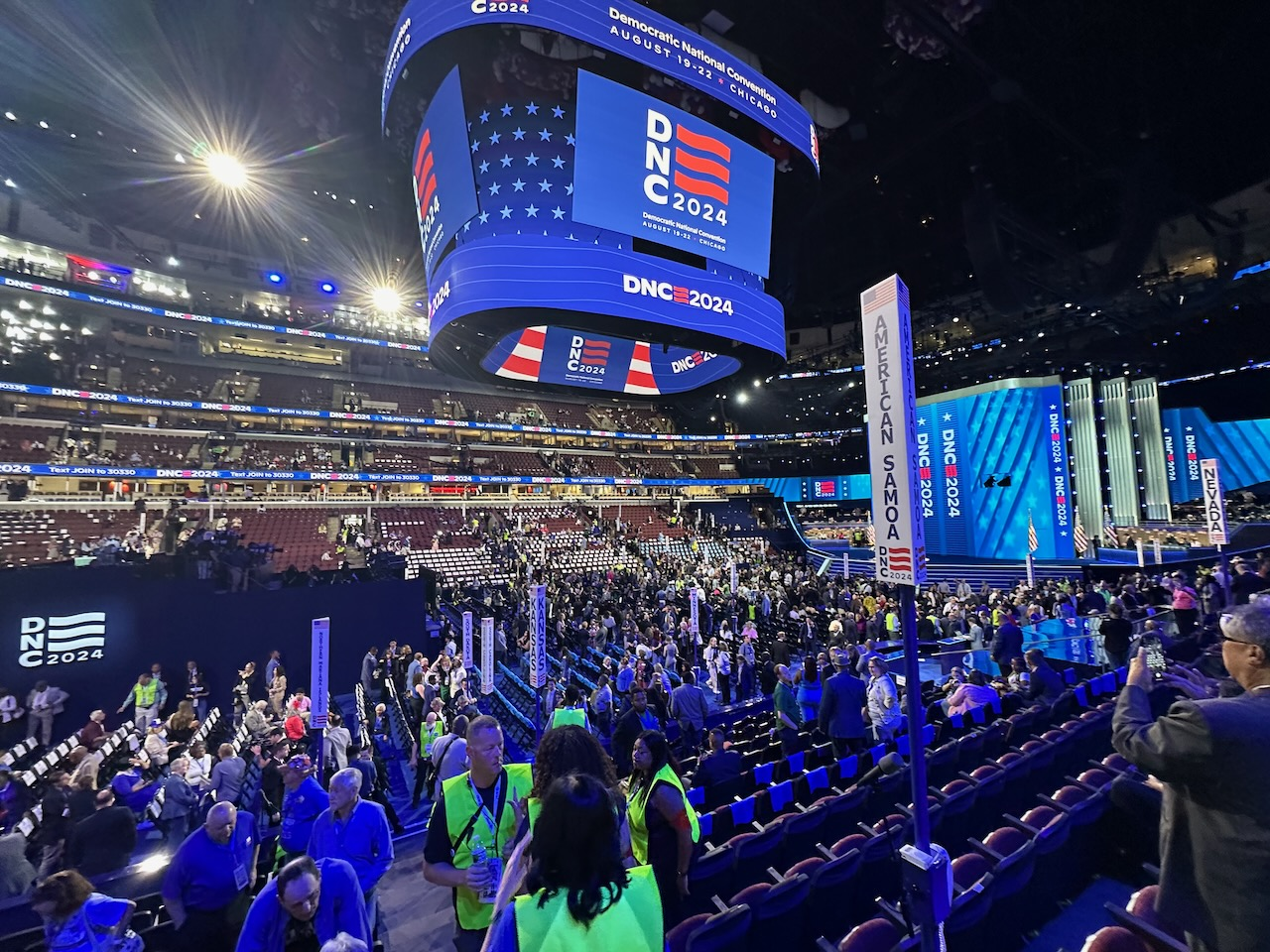
Interior of the United Center during the 2024 Democratic National Convention.

Atlanta, Chicago, Houston, and New York City submitted bids by the May 28, 2022, deadline. In January 2023, Democratic National Committee officials confirmed that the finalist cities would be Atlanta, Chicago, and New York City, with Houston no longer being considered.

Early into Chicago's bid, in addition to proposing United Center as the primary venue and McCormick Place as a possible venue for secondary convention business, Museum Campus, Navy Pier, and Wintrust Arena were also additionally floated as facilities that could additionally be used for secondary convention business. The Chicago bid was chiefly championed by Illinois Governor J. B. Pritzker and Chicago Mayor Lori Lightfoot. Bid supporters touted the city's large airports, cultural attractions, and the central location of the convention venues and the hotels where delegates and other visitors would stay. They argued that Chicago's location in the Midwest would be wise given the high importance for the Democrats of the nearby swing states of Wisconsin and Michigan. Democratic Party leaders in other Midwestern states threw their support behind Chicago's bid. They also touted that the city's hotels generally employ union laborers. Governor Pritzker, a billionaire who had contributed large sums to the organization fundraising for Chicago's effort, made a pledge to the Democratic Party that the party itself would not incur any financial losses from the organization of the convention. The remaining mayoral candidates in the 2023 Chicago mayoral election runoff, Brandon Johnson and Paul Vallas, vowed to support the city's effort to host the convention. The victory of the progressive Johnson over the more conservative Vallas in the city's runoff election was speculated to have helped Chicago's prospects.

Supporters of Atlanta's bid argued that a convention in their city could aid the Democrats in making political inroads in the South, touting the city's history in civil rights activism and its state's recent ascendence in 2020 to become a key swing state in presidential and U.S. Senate elections. These points were countered by New York and Chicago backers, who criticized the city's lack of unionized hotels and the state's "Right to Work" law as discordant with the party's alliance with organized laborers.

On April 11, 2023, it was announced that Chicago had been selected as the convention's location, with the United Center to serve as the primary venue and McCormick Place to be a secondary facility used for various early-day convention activities. Chicago and the previously selected Republican National Convention host city, Milwaukee, are approximately 90 miles apart on the coast of Lake Michigan. Not since 1972, when both conventions last shared a host city, have the major party convention sites been so closely located. Illinois is regarded to be a solidly Democratic state. No party has opted to hold their convention in a non-swing state since the 2004 election, though Chicago is within a few hours' drive of the swing states of Wisconsin and Michigan.

Bidding cities
City	State	Status	Proposed venue(s)	Previous major party conventions hosted by city
Chicago	Illinois	Winner	United Center (primary venue); McCormick Place (secondary venue)	Democratic: 1864, 1884, 1892, 1896, 1932, 1940, 1944, 1952, 1956, 1968, 1996; Republican: 1860, 1868, 1880, 1884, 1888, 1904, 1908, 1912, 1916, 1920, 1932, 1944, 1952, 1960; Progressive: 1912, 1916
Atlanta	Georgia	Finalist	State Farm Arena (primary venue); Georgia World Congress Center (secondary venue)	Democratic: 1988
New York City	New York	Finalist	Madison Square Garden (main venue); Javits Center (secondary venue)	Democratic: 1868, 1924, 1976, 1980, 1992; Republican: 2004
Houston	Texas	Non-finalist		Democratic: 1928; Republican: 1992

== Logistics ==
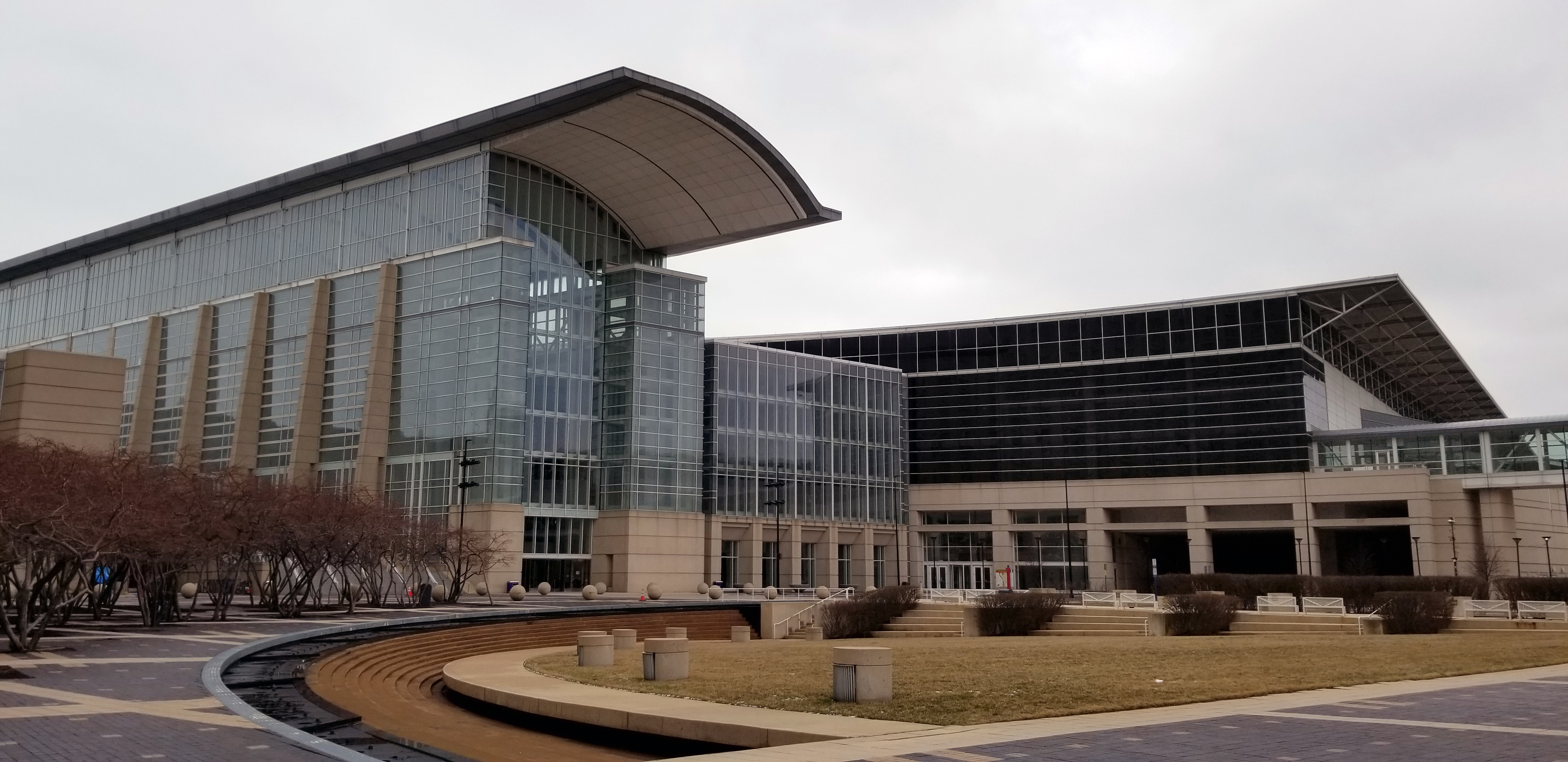
A portion of Chicago's McCormick Place convention center, to be utilized for secondary convention business

The convention was held on August 19–22, 2024. The United Center, previously the location of the 1996 Democratic National Convention, was the convention's primary location. McCormick Place hosted secondary business of the convention. The convention was attended by between 5,000 and 7,000 delegates and alternate delegates. Approximately thirty hotels in the city provided lodging to convention delegates. The convention was expected to bring an overall 50,000 visitors to Chicago.

There were three funding sources for the convention. With the Pennsylvania Democratic Party donating over 24 million to the convention, the bid committee pledged that the host committee would raise $84.697 million. Through 2024 Democratic National Convention Committee Inc., money was raised in accordance with the Federal Election Commission's regulations. Additionally, $50 million were received in federal funds for security costs, as has been the case for all major party conventions since 2004. Congress was urged to increase this to $75 million. The Democratic National Committee also requested the bidding cities agree to open a $30 million line of credit, which Chicago agreed to do.

=== Convention leadership ===
On August 8, 2023, convention leadership was announced. Minyon Moore was named the chair of the convention. Alex Hornbrook was named executive director, and Louisa Terrell was named a senior advisor. In his role as senior advisor to the Biden Victory Fund, Roger Lau was assigned an expanded role to provide advice to the convention leadership.

=== Security ===
$50 million in federal funding was provided for security spending. As a major party presidential nominating convention, the 2024 Democratic National Convention was designated a National Special Security Event. It was the second such event held in Chicago to receive this designation, with the first having been the 2012 NATO Summit. By June 2023, the United States Secret Service had begun collaborating on preparations for the convention with the Chicago Police Department and other police departments that will be involved in convention security.

Protests and demonstrations related to the U.S. government's support for Israel in their invasion of Gaza emerged while the convention was being held. In preparation for the event, party leaders demonstrated confidence in Chicago Police and federal officials to manage protestors, using such methods as drawing set parameters for demonstrations to take place, as well as initiating mass arrests in cases of these regulations being violated. As of April 2024, organizers expected as many as 30,000 protestors in Chicago during the convention. Commentators have drawn comparisons between the 2024 convention and the 1968 convention, also held in Chicago, in which protests opposed to the Vietnam War turned violent when the city utilized extreme levels of police brutality to suppress the protestors.

In May 2024, Politico reported that party leaders were considering limiting in-person gatherings at United Center to primetime sessions only to reduce the possibility of disruption, which would include holding official business to McCormick Place (and the possibility of the formal certification taking place before the convention due to conflicts with deadline requirements in Ohio), and retaining elements of 2020's convention (including a focus on prerecorded segments such as the virtual roll call).

In light of the assassination attempt on Donald Trump on July 13, the Secret Service secured the United Center and the immediate area surrounding it, and the Chicago Police Department secured everything outside the inner perimeter, with both agencies securing rooftops of all buildings that may have had a line of sight to the United Center.

On August 12, the first round of parking restrictions took effect for the DNC in Chicago. Some residents such as people at a senior living apartment complex near major Democratic National Convention sites in Chicago were confused and frustrated with new no-parking zone restrictions outside the Chicago DNC perimeter. They said that no-parking signs had started appearing on their streets, even though they were outside the convention's car-free zones. These residents found it an unwelcome surprise to lose their street parking, which they claimed interfered with their day-to-day lives.

Organizations such as Samidoun, Code Pink, the ANSWER Coalition and several others demonstrated at the convention.

== Presidential nomination vote, conducted before convention ==
By tradition, because the Democratic Party held the White House, its convention was scheduled for after the 2024 Republican National Convention, starting on August 19. In April, Ohio officials warned the Biden campaign that they would not delay Ohio's August 7, deadline to get on the ballot, as Ohio had done in 2012 and 2020. On May 28, the Democratic National Committee proposed an early online nomination vote, but its Rules and Bylaws Committee needed to vote on amending the call to the convention, and the full Democratic National Committee needed to vote on adopting the amendment. On June 2, Ohio passed a law delaying its deadline, but because the law was set to take effect at the end of August, the DNC said it would continue with a virtual roll call vote in order to avoid litigation from Republicans. On June 4, the Democratic National Committee's Rules and Bylaws Committee voted to amend the call to let the Democratic National Convention Committee to advance the convention's dates and to allow the convention's committees to adopt the permanent rules and permanent list of delegates early for the virtual nomination vote. On June 20, the full Democratic National Committee voted 360 to 2 to approve the amendment for an official online nomination vote before Ohio's deadline. On July 15, the DNC sent an email asking delegates to indicate on a drop-down menu on who they will vote for: Joe Biden, Jason Palmer (who won American Samoa), Rep. Dean Phillips, or "uncommitted." Answers to that questionnaire reportedly essentially gave the DNC a whip count on how firm – or soft – support for Biden was among actual delegates.

After Biden's performance at the June presidential debate caused concern among Democrats, some House Democrats circulated a letter on July 16 proposing that the "virtual roll call" vote be cancelled, fearing it would occur the next week. On July 17, the DNC decided that the virtual roll call vote should be no earlier than August 1 after concerns from House Minority Leader Hakeem Jeffries and Senate Majority Leader Chuck Schumer. On July 19, the Democratic National Convention's Rules Committee met to deliberate on the virtual nomination vote but went into recess without adopting any rules. After Biden ultimately withdrew from the race on July 21 and immediately endorsed Harris to replace him in his place as the party's presidential nominee, Harris said she did not want a virtual roll call and preferred a process that follows regular order. On July 22, the DNC laid out a draft plan affirming a virtual nomination vote in the first week of August. On July 24, the Democratic National Convention's Rules Committee passed the draft rules for the early virtual nomination vote by a vote of 157 to 3.

== Media ==
In addition to traditional journalists, the Democratic National Committee recruited content creators, with large followings on YouTube, Instagram, and other social media platforms and provided them with access to media space at the convention.

The Democratic National Committee also invited hundreds of celebrities to the event to show support of Harris. Some artists, such as Beyonce, spoke on the usage of their music in the convention, saying they gave the party the right to use their music for free as a token of support.

== Abbreviated campaign ==
On July 21, presumptive nominee President Joe Biden announced that he would not seek reelection. That same day, he endorsed Vice President Kamala Harris as the Democratic nominee. Biden dropping out freed the DNC delegates bound to him from their pledge to vote for his nomination. A couple of hours after Biden's announcement, Harris announced her candidacy for the Democratic nomination. The Biden campaign officially changed its name to Harris for President and officially registered Harris as its presidential candidate. Shortly after Harris announced her candidacy on July 21, former President Bill Clinton endorsed her bid, while former President Barack Obama expressed his support for an open nominating process at the upcoming convention. Key progressive voices swiftly rallied behind Harris, with Reps. Cori Bush, Ilhan Omar, Alexandria Ocasio-Cortez, and Ayanna Pressley, and Indivisible endorsing her. The only member of the progressive group of Democrats known as "The Squad" that declined to endorse Harris was U.S. Representative Rashida Tlaib.

The next day, Harris secured tentative support from well beyond the majority of convention delegates needed to win the upcoming vote and become the party's nominee for president. By July 23, leaders of the party, such as former House Speaker Nancy Pelosi, House Minority Leader Hakeem Jeffries, and Senate Majority Leader Chuck Schumer coalesced around Harris's candidacy, including those mentioned as the other most viable prospects such as Michigan Governor Gretchen Whitmer and California Governor Gavin Newsom. Harris received the endorsement of all of the incumbent Democratic members of the United States House of Representatives from her home state of California except for US Representative Josh Harder from California's 9th congressional district. The vast majority of the incumbent Democratic members in the United States House of Representatives quickly endorsed Harris, with notable exceptions being the three co-chairs of the Blue Dog Coalition caucus of centrist and moderate members from the Democratic Party in the United States House of Representatives US Representative Jared Golden, US Representative Mary Peltola, and US Representative Marie Gluesenkamp Perez. Also, Harris received the endorsement of 46 of the 47 incumbent Democratic members in the United States Senate. Jon Tester of Montana was the only incumbent Senator in the Democratic Party not to endorse Harris for President.

Marianne Williamson initially called for an open convention, but eventually declined to file for nomination before the deadline. On the day of Biden's withdrawal, U.S. Senator Joe Manchin, who left the Democratic Party in May 2024, was reported to be considering a presidential run against Harris at the convention, though by the following day, he had ruled it out. Also, on the day that Biden withdrew from the race, U.S. Congressman Dean Phillips proposed a straw poll of delegates ahead of the Democratic National Convention to determine the party's top four presidential contenders, who would then take part in four town halls outlining their platforms. After the town halls, Phillips proposed the delegates would vote to choose the nominee. On July 24, Jason Palmer released his delegates and encouraged them to vote for Harris at the convention. On July 26, former President Barack Obama and former first lady Michelle Obama endorsed Kamala Harris in her presidential bid.

Candidates were to be formally nominated beginning July 25 and ending at 6pm EDT on July 27. Candidates needed to accrue the support of at least 300 delegates each, with no more than 50 from any one state delegation, by 6pm EDT on July 30. Delegates could vote for any candidate, but votes for candidates who are not Democrats would be counted as "present". Formal requests to nominate Harris and several others (including Ralph Hoffman, Gibran Nicholas, and Robby Wells) were made before the July 27 deadline, but only Harris passed the threshold of at least 300 delegates, gaining the support of 3,923 delegates. There was also an option to abstain from voting, which was chosen by Alaska Congresswoman Mary Peltola, Maine Congressman Jared Golden, and Montana Senator Jon Tester. In total, 79 delegates did not cast votes in the DNC virtual roll call.

The virtual nomination took place from August 1 to August 5. The delegates voted online, through a secure email system, or over the phone. On August 4, twenty-nine Uncommitted delegates from eight states took part in a virtual roll call where they voted for Palestinian victims over Harris. On August 2, Harris earned a majority of delegate votes and became the official presidential nominee when voting closed on August 5.

== Delegate support by candidate ==
The "Pledged delegates by candidate following primaries" table below reflects the delegate count after the 2024 Democratic Party presidential primaries, while the "Final virtual roll call results" table reflects the totals following the virtual roll call that nominated Kamala Harris. Superdelegates were allowed to vote during the signature collection and on the first ballot of the virtual roll call for the presidential nomination, as Harris gained enough signatures to win a majority of delegates. The Democratic National Committee had imposed reforms on superdelegates back in August 2018, barring superdelegates from voting on the first ballot at the Democratic National Convention unless a candidate has secured a majority of the convention's delegates using only pledged delegates, whose votes were earned during the primary process. This rule allowed superdelegates to vote only in a contested convention on the second ballot or vote on the first ballot only in the event of an overwhelming victory for the candidate with the support of pledged delegates that were attained for them in the primaries.

Pledged delegates by candidate following primaries
Candidate	Pledged delegates
Joe Biden (withdrawn)	3,905
Uncommitted	37
Dean Phillips (withdrawn)	4
Jason Palmer (withdrawn)	3
Total pledged delegate votes	3,949

Final virtual roll call by candidate results
Candidate	Final results
Kamala Harris	4,567 (Note: PBS indicates that Harris had 4,563 votes)
Present	52 (Note: All votes cast for anyone other than Harris were counted as “present” because Harris was the only candidate to qualify for the official virtual roll call.)
Joe Biden (withdrawn)	0 (Note: Joe Biden withdrew from the presidential race on July 21, releasing his pledged delegates at the Democratic National Convention. Biden endorsed Vice President Kamala Harris as the nominee, though his delegates were not bound to this endorsement.)
Dean Phillips (withdrawn)	0 (Note: In April, Phillips encouraged his delegates to vote for Biden at the convention. In July, Phillips endorsed Vice President Kamala Harris while also pushing for a 'mini primary’ to decide on the Democratic nominee.)
Jason Palmer (withdrawn)	0 (Note: On July 24, Palmer released his delegates and encouraged them to vote for Kamala Harris at the convention.)
Total delegate votes	4,619
Abstained	76 (Note: There was also an option to abstain from voting for the Democratic National Committee’s presidential nominee, chosen by the Alaska Congresswoman Mary Peltola, Maine Congressman Jared Golden, and Montana Senator Jon Tester. In total, 76 delegates did not cast votes in the DNC virtual roll call.)

== Vice presidential nomination ==
Some speculated candidates included Governors Andy Beshear of Kentucky, Josh Shapiro of Pennsylvania, and Tim Walz of Minnesota, Senator Mark Kelly of Arizona, and Secretary of Transportation Pete Buttigieg of Michigan. (Note: Buttigieg served as the mayor of South Bend, Indiana from 2012 to 2020 and was a resident of the state during his 2020 presidential campaign. He changed his residency to Michigan in 2022 and voted there in that year’s midterm elections.) Governor Gretchen Whitmer of Michigan declined consideration for the nomination, while Governor Roy Cooper of North Carolina withdrew his name from consideration during vetting.

Harris chose Walz as her running mate on August 6 and the ticket was certified as nominated on the same night.

== Platform ==
On July 9, the convention's Platform Committee held a hearing in which there was a call for an end to U.S. military aid to the government of Israel. On July 11, the committee held a meeting to draft the party platform. Although it removed mentions of "Black Lives Matter", it included police reform and the studying of reparations. It removed a mention of Medicare for All but called for ending medical debt. On July 16, the Platform Committee submitted the draft platform for the approval of the full convention.

=== Notable provisions ===
The platform was drafted before Biden withdrew and largely refers to Biden's presidency, though it also mentions Harris. There was little disagreement about the platform, unlike in 2016 or 2020 when many provisions were negotiated, instead focusing on the Biden–Harris administration's record and goals.

The draft did not include a call to end military aid to Israel, instead calling for an immediate and lasting ceasefire between Israel and Hamas. It also called for raising a billionaire income tax, lowering childcare costs for low-income families, codifying Roe v. Wade in the wake of the Supreme Court's 2022 decision to overturn it, advancing voting rights, banning assault weapons, and expanding Social Security and Medicare.

The 2024 platform does not call for declaring a national climate emergency or banning fracking. It does support electric vehicles and investing in clean energy.

The 2024 platform opposes defunding the police, and is the first time since the 2004 platform to not mention the death penalty. It does call for rescheduling cannabis at the federal level and permitting states to legalize it. It supports immigration reform and securing the border.

== Schedule ==
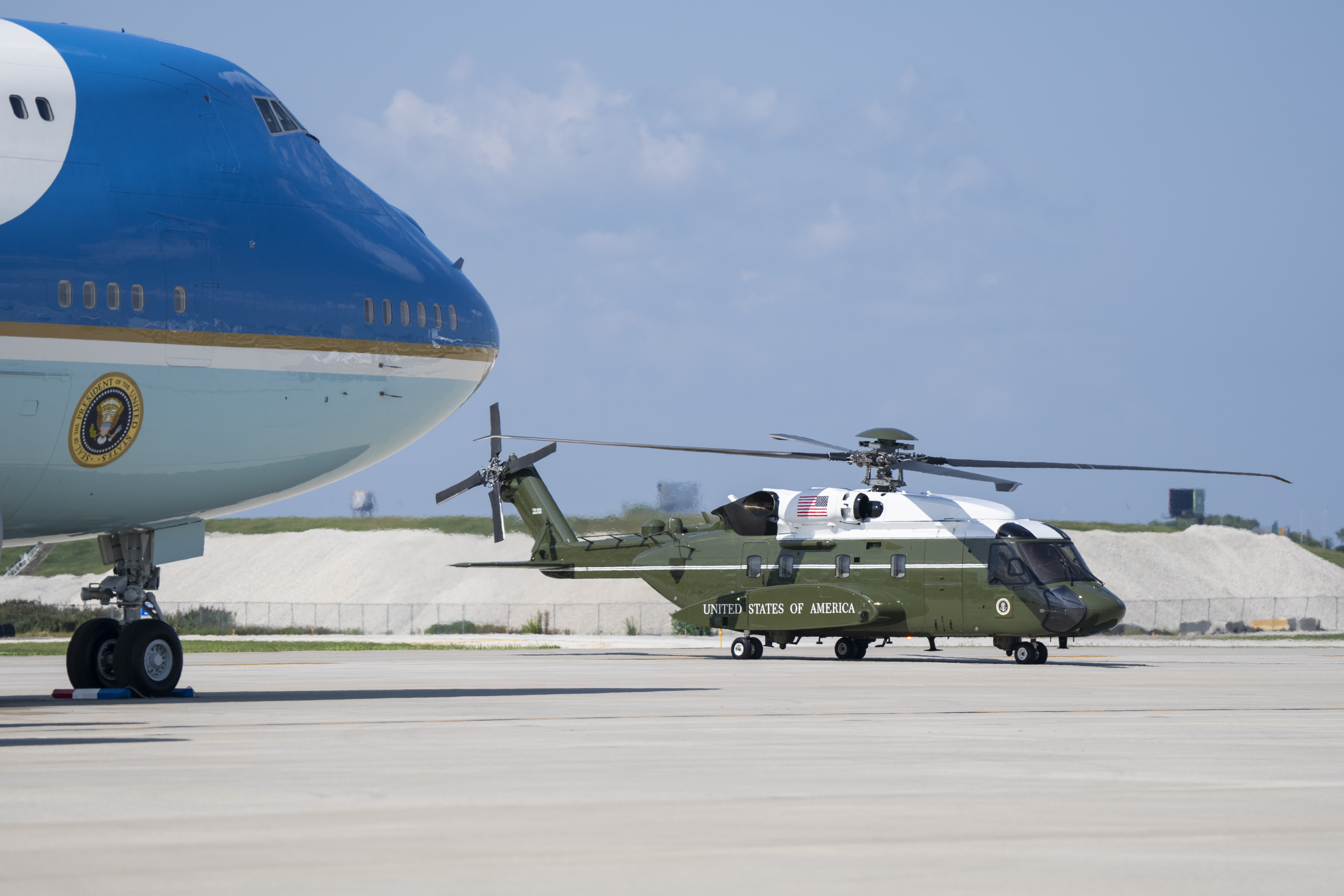
Marine One, carrying Joe and Jill Biden, in Chicago prior to the opening night of the convention on August 19

There were two official venues for the convention:

The McCormick Place convention center (with lighter security) hosted dozens of exhibitions, meetings and receptions, mostly during the daytime, and the United Center (with heavy security) hosted the official business sessions and the main speakers.

Additionally, on August 20—prior to the start time of the convention's primetime speeches—Harris and Walz appeared and spoke at a related campaign rally inside of the Fiserv Forum in Milwaukee, Wisconsin. The Fiserv Forum is approximately 80 miles (130 km) from the United Center, and had weeks earlier been the main venue of the Republican National Convention.

Similarly to the Democratic Party's 2020 convention, each evening's program featured a celebrity host.

=== First night (Monday, August 19: For the People) ===
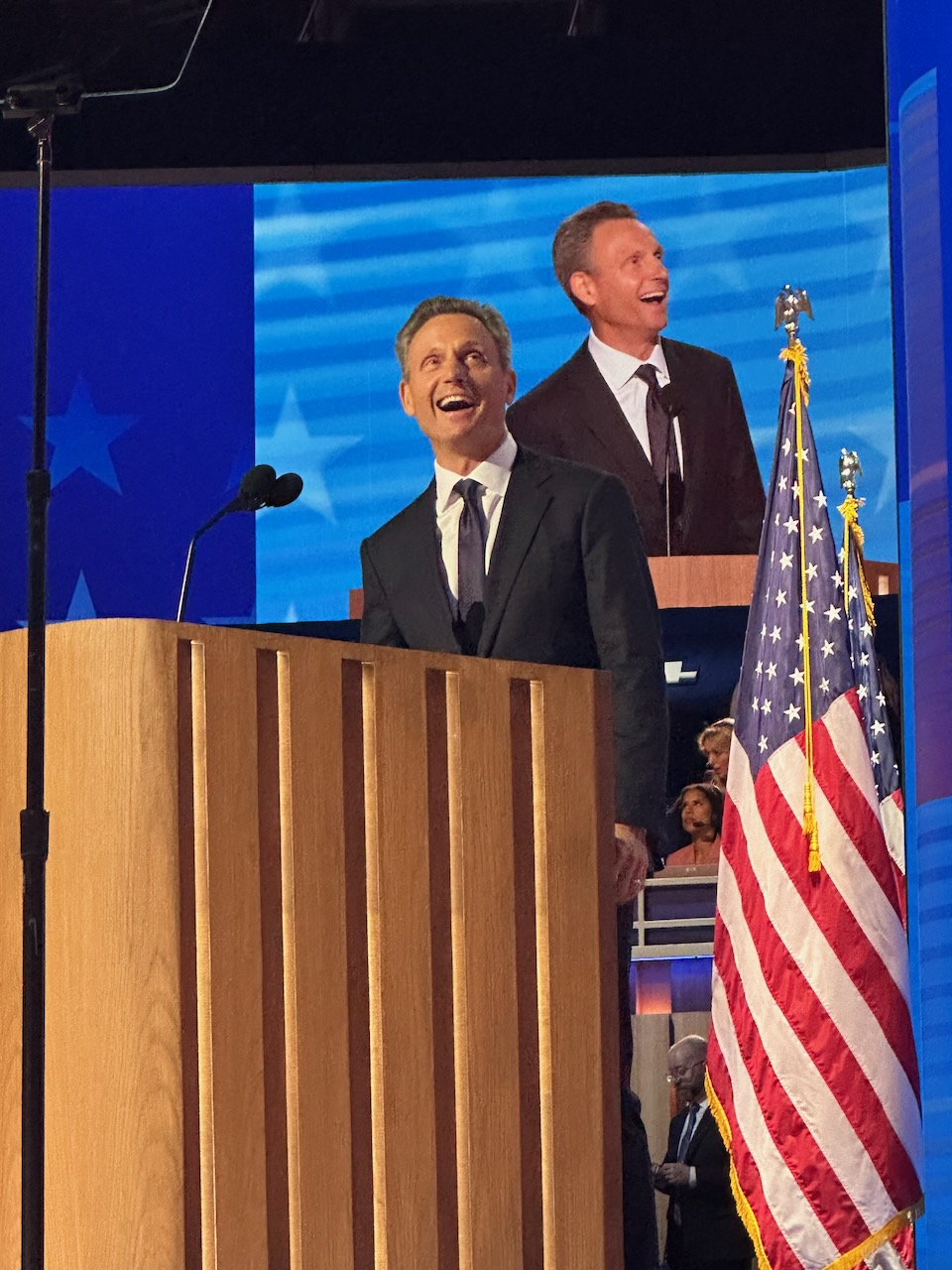
Actor Tony Goldwyn emceed Night 1 of the 2024 Democratic National Convention

The first night was emceed by actor and director Tony Goldwyn and included musical performances by Mickey Guyton and Jason Isbell. It included tributes to outgoing president Joe Biden, who himself delivered the night's closing address. Alexandria Ocasio-Cortez, 2016 Democratic presidential nominee Hillary Clinton, and first lady Jill Biden and daughter Ashley spoke. Harris made a brief surprise appearance on-stage to pay tribute to Biden and welcome the attendees. The party platform, drafted by delegates in the Platform Committee, was adopted by the full body of delegates by voice vote.

=== Second night (Tuesday, August 20: A Bold Vision for America's Future) ===
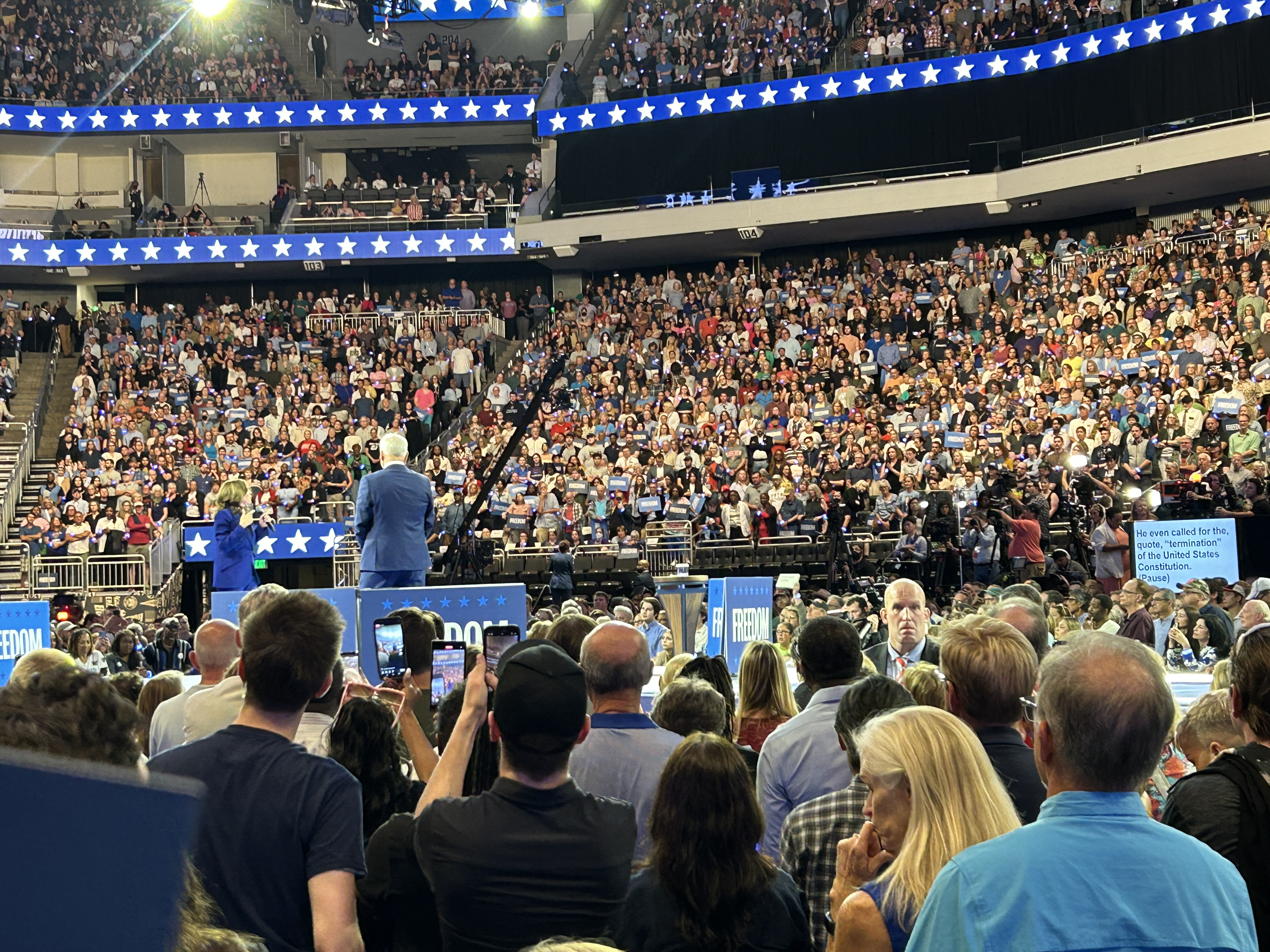
Harris (joined on stage by Walz) addresses a crowd during a rally at the Fiserv Forum in Milwaukee, Wisconsin held on the second night of the convention

The second night was emceed by television commentator and political strategist Ana Navarro (a Republican Harris supporter), and included performances by Patti LaBelle and Common. Former first lady Michelle Obama and former president Barack Obama, who gave the closing addresses, and second gentleman Doug Emhoff were among those that spoke. Jason Carter, grandson of former U.S. President Jimmy Carter, also gave a speech on this night and honored his grandfather. Another presidential grandson, John F. Kennedy's grandson Jack Schlossberg, spoke as well.

Described as a "celebratory roll call" or ceremonial roll call, delegates ceremonially reported voting results for the presidential nomination hosted by Secretary of the DNC, Jason Rae. Led by DJ Cassidy, each state's delegation was accompanied by their choice of background music during the roll call of the states, largely consisting of songs from artists from each respective state. The atmosphere of the roll call was likened by many outlets to a dance party, and seen as more exciting than conventional roll calls seen at most previous conventions.

Meanwhile, Harris and Walz held a separate rally at the Fiserv Forum in Milwaukee that was attended by 15,000 spectators. A portion of Harris' remarks there were telecast to the United Center following the conclusion of the roll call.

=== Third night (Wednesday, August 21: A Fight for Our Freedoms) ===
The third night was emceed by actress Mindy Kaling, featuring performances by Stevie Wonder, John Legend, Sheila E and Maren Morris. Vice presidential nominee Minnesota Governor Tim Walz delivered his acceptance speech. Pete Buttigieg also spoke.

The evening was headlined by Walz and Clinton. Others speeches included one by House Speaker Emerita Nancy Pelosi was scheduled to speak.

=== Fourth night (Thursday, August 22: For Our Future) ===
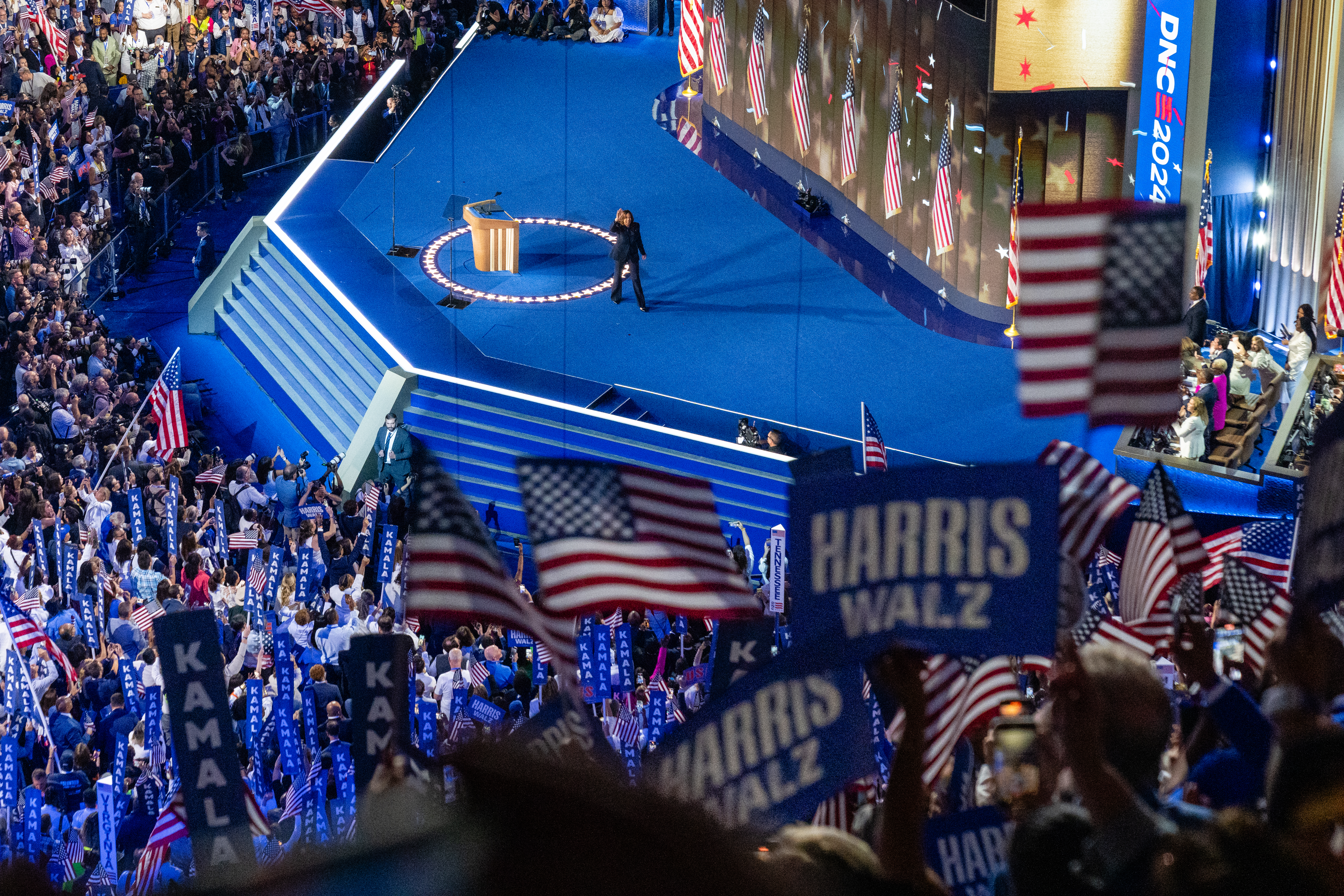
Harris delivering her acceptance speech on the convention's fourth night

The final night was emceed by actress Kerry Washington. Presidential nominee Vice President Harris delivered her acceptance speech. During the fourth night, Vice President Kamala Harris briefly opened up about her past, covering what led her to her career choice. Kamala Harris also spoke about why she does not allow Donald Trump to get under her skin, stating "My mother was a brilliant, five foot tall, brown woman with an accent, and as the eldest child, I saw how the world would sometimes treat her...yet, she never lost her cool". She focused on inspiration towards the younger female crowd, hoping to inspire a new generation of women in politics.

== Panels ==
The secondary venue for the convention was at the McCormick Place convention center. Among the daytime events held at McCormick Place there was a number of panel discussions and rallies.

The first-ever panel on Palestinian rights was hosted by the convention on Monday, August 19. Speakers included Keith Ellison, Uncommitted co-founder Layla Elabed, former Michigan Congressman Andy Levin, Jim Zogby, Democratic Party organizer Hala Hijazi and pediatric surgeon Tanya Haj-Hassan.

== Protests and demonstrations ==
In advance of the convention, a coalition called "March on the DNC 2024" was formed to organize large protests in Chicago during convention. Much of the protest activity at the convention was organized by this coalition, which touted itself as having 200 member groups. Causes represented at its protests included reproductive freedom, racial justice, and LGBTQ rights. However, its protests were heavily focused on the protesting against the US relationship with Israel and the Gaza war; and on calling for an arms embargo to be imposed on Israel, as well as a ceasefire to the war.

Protests at the convention, including the Gaza War related protests, were largely peaceful. On the convention's first day a number of protesters were arrested. Some were arrested for tearing down a portion of the security fencing near the United Center. Others were arrested after an unsanctioned demonstration was held outside of the Israeli Consulate in Chicago.

=== Gaza war protests ===
Police and protesters on the first day of the Democratic National Convention

In the months leading up of the convention, sizable Gaza war protests had included significant criticism of Biden administration's handling of relations with Israel amid the Gaza war were widely expected to be organized in Chicago during the convention.

Numerous rallies and marches were staged during the conventions. However, the number of protesters that participated in protests at the conventions ultimately fell far short of pre-convention expectations. March on the DNC 2024 had announced an expectation of 20,000 participants at their protest on the conventions opening day. The actual protest turnout was significantly smaller, with city officials estimating that the participating crowd was roughly 3,500. An Associated Press story published shortly after the conclusion of the convention commented, "as far as Chicago's storied protests go, the numbers outside the Democratic National Convention were unremarkable."

During the ceremonial roll call of delegates on the convention floor to decide the Democratic party nominee for president, dozens of delegates voted "Present" as a protest vote. Some of these delegates publicly expressed they voted this way to express frustration with the Biden-Harris administration's handling of the war in Gaza. The delegates who voted "Present" had their votes voiced out loud by the state delegations during the roll call. Although notably, the Kentucky Democratic Party was the only state delegation that did not announce their 'present' votes in the roll call.

When the Uncommitted National Movement was informed that the DNC wouldn't allow a Palestinian speaker, Uncommitted delegates staged a sit-in outside the convention. The activists again called for an arms embargo on Israel, and emphasized the suffering of children in Gaza. A Michigan delegate said his strategy was to initially work within the Democratic hierarchy from the inside, and that it was frustrating the Harris campaign had denied their requests. The group was joined inside the security perimeter by healthcare workers, members of the Chicago Teachers Union, Muslim Women for Harris, and US Representatives Summer Lee, Ilhan Omar and Cori Bush. Alexandria Ocasio-Cortez joined via FaceTime. Among the names submitted as potential speakers were Illinois state Rep. Abdelnasser Rashid and Georgia state Rep. Ruwa Romman.

About 40 Uncommitted delegates staged a sit-in on the final evening of the convention, spending the night on the sidewalk outside the United Center and remained there in the morning. The protesting delegates objected to the party not meeting their demand for a speaker representing their cause to be given a speaking slot on the evening program, particularly taking issue with the lack of a Palestinian-centered speech in light of the parents of Hersh Goldberg-Polin (an American-Israeli hostage taken by Hamas) being given a speaking slot. As a result, Muslim Women for Harris-Walz announced it would disband and Uncommitted delegates were seen through Union Center locked arm in arm, wearing Keffiyehs and chanting "Ceasefire now." More protesters blocked roads as attendees left the convention for the night. Some chanted "We're young, we're strong, we'll rally all night long."

In June 2026, progressive political commentator Ta-Nehisi Coates argued the Democratic Party refusing to allow a Palestinian American to speak at the DNC contributed to Harris's defeat in the presidential election. The New York Times reporter Lulu Garcia-Navarro said many people in the activist community felt "very betrayed" by the absence of a Palestinian American speaker and felt that their voices were silenced.

=== Other protests and demonstrations ===
On the third day of the convention, a breakfast for delegates at a nearby hotel was disrupted when unknown individuals put maggots in food. That same day, activists gained access to and disrupted an ExxonMobil-sponsored panel hosted by Punchbowl News on climate change at a downtown Chicago hotel featuring US Representative Lizzie Fletcher from Texas and an Exxon executive. The activists shouted loudly about Exxon's history of deceit and climate obstruction.

A pro-Israel protest occurred at Union Park during the third day of the conventions. While it was taking place, pro-Palestinian protesters marched past it.

== Notable attendees ==
In addition to politicians, speakers, and performers, there were many celebrity attendees at the convention. These included Uzo Aduba, Anthony Anderson, Jacinda Ardern, Sean Astin, Yvette Nicole Brown, Don Cheadle, Misha Collins, Stephen Colbert, Jesse Tyler Ferguson, Mark Hamill, Patti LaBelle, Spike Lee, Eva Longoria, Mandy Patinkin, Jason Palmer, Busy Philipps, Dean Phillips, Wendell Pierce, Octavia Spencer, James Taylor, and Kerry Washington. Political commentator Hasan Piker broadcast his attendance on his Twitch live stream. Conservative internet personality Charlie Kirk and far right activist Jack Posobiec also attended the event, sharing videos of their interactions with other attendees online; Kirk's confrontations with Piker, Parker Short, president of the Georgia Young Democrats, and 12-year-old influencer Knowa De Baraso all went viral on the first day of the convention. Comedic musician and influencer duo A Twink and a Redhead attended, and are cited to have started the viral movement "Twinks for Kamala" on CNN.

In the hours and days leading to the DNC's fourth night, rumors widely circulated online claiming that an unknown "surprise guest" was slated to make an unannounced appearance. This led to rampant speculation on social media, with the singers Beyoncé and Taylor Swift being the most popular guesses. On Thursday afternoon, the tabloid TMZ and the newspaper The Hill both reported that Beyoncé would perform, adding fuel to the rumors. Republican senator Mitt Romney, another popular guess, denied on social media that he was the "surprise guest", while Deadline Hollywood reported that Swift was unlikely to appear. As Beyoncé gradually became the frontrunner, Rolling Stone reported that Chicago officials had begun making preparations for her unconfirmed arrival. Hours after TMZ's initial report, a representative for Beyoncé told The Hollywood Reporter that the singer would not attend the convention, saying she "was never scheduled to be there". Beyoncé ultimately did not make an appearance, nor did any "surprise guest", though her music was heard over the loudspeakers following Harris' speech. Her non-appearance remained a topic of conversation on social media after the event, with some commentators opining that it ultimately benefited Harris because it allowed her to retain the spotlight.

== See also ==
- 2024 Democratic Party presidential primaries
- 2024 Republican National Convention
- Democratic Party of Illinois
- 2024 Green National Convention
- 2024 Libertarian National Convention
- 2024 Constitution National Convention

== Notes ==
Preceded by 2020; Milwaukee, Wisconsin and other locations	Democratic National Conventions	Succeeded by 2028; TBD
