= Knowa De Baraso =

American political commentator (born 2011)

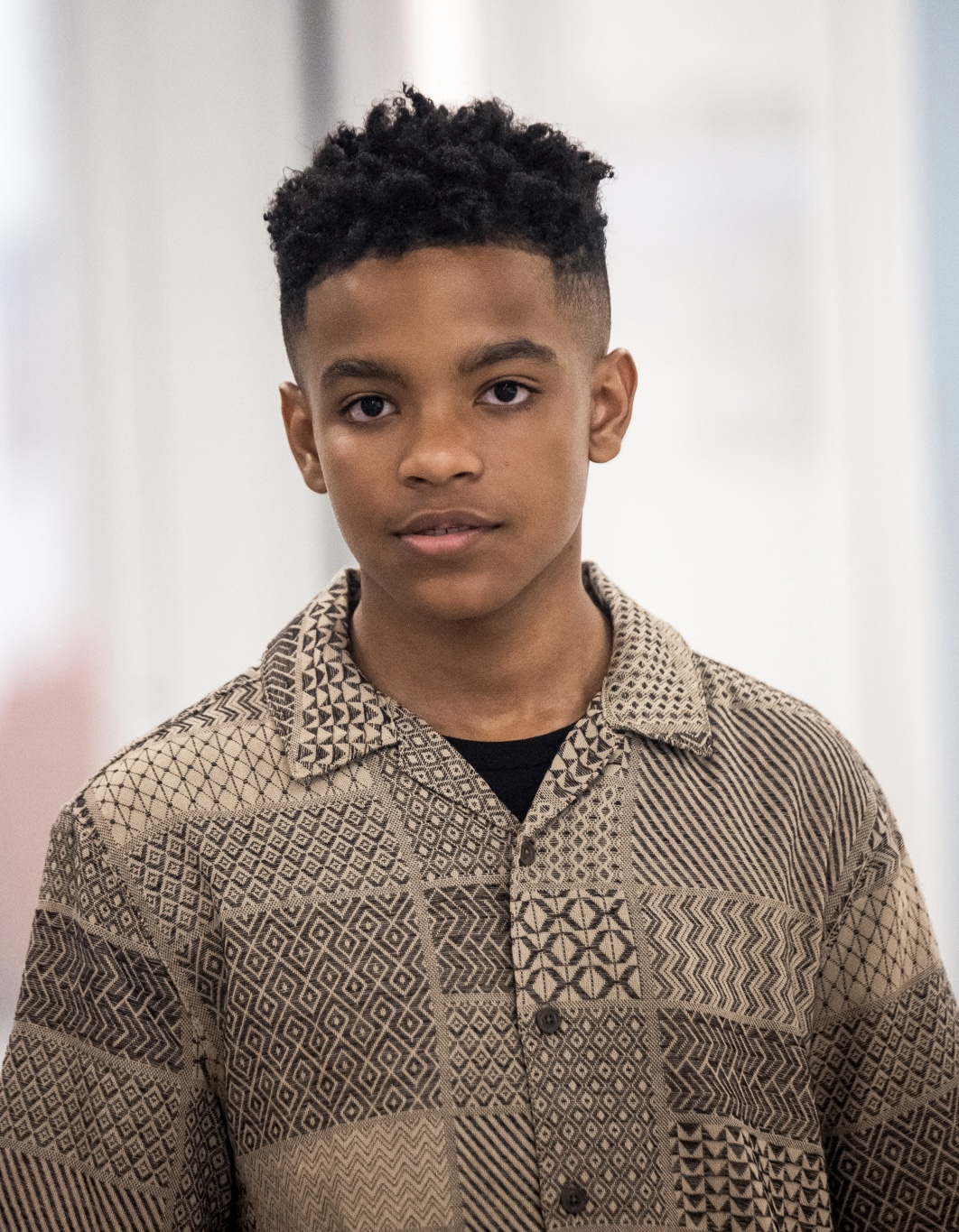
- De Baraso in 2026
- Born: October 18, 2011 (age 14); Atlanta, Georgia, US
- Occupations: Social media influencer; Podcaster; Political commentator
- Known for: Political debates, social media presence
- Political party: Democratic

Knowa De Baraso (born October 18, 2011) is an American internet personality, social media influencer, and political commentator. At age twelve, he gained prominence during the 2024 Democratic National Convention when he debated Mike Lindell, CEO of MyPillow. Following the exchange, De Baraso was interviewed by several national and international media outlets, where he discussed his support for Vice President Kamala Harris and his interest in youth engagement in political processes.

As of 2025, De Baraso hosts the weekly podcast Now You Know with Knowa De Baraso, which features interviews and discussions on politics, social issues, and popular culture.

== Early life ==
De Baraso was born on October 18, 2011, and as of 2025, he lives with his mother in Atlanta, Georgia, where he is home-schooled.

De Baraso began using social media at age seven, initially posting vlogs and Roblox content before switching to political advocacy. His interest in politics began in 2022 after attending a campaign event for then-Georgia gubernatorial candidate Stacey Abrams.

== Career ==
During the 2024 Democratic National Convention, journalist Roland Martin offered De Baraso the opportunity to host a show on the Black Star Network, a digital media platform founded by Martin. Martin stated that De Baraso's enthusiasm, energy, and command of political issues impressed him during their meeting at the convention, and he saw potential in De Baraso as a young voice in media.

In 2025, De Baraso launched the weekly podcast Now You Know with Knowa De Baraso in partnership with iHeartPodcasts and Reasoned Choice Media. He described the show as a “pop culture and politics podcast” and stated that it would not be “100 percent politics-focused.” Guests have included former Vice President Kamala Harris, comedian Roy Wood Jr, former White House Press Secretary Karine Jean-Pierre, and singer Macy Gray. Variety stated that “De Baraso's own career is an example that smart discourse can come from unpredictable places.”

== Political engagement ==
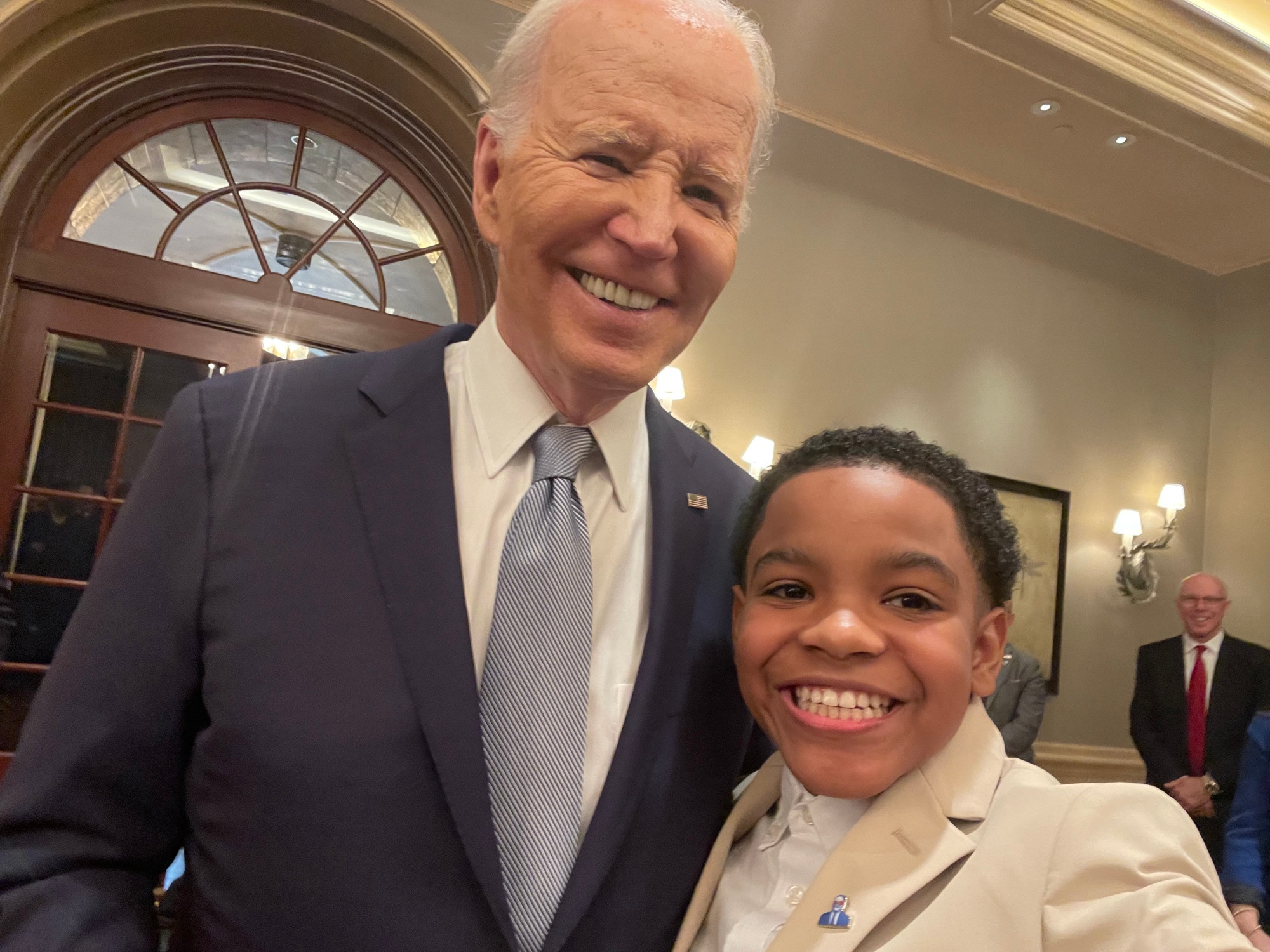
De Baraso and President Joe Biden in 2024

De Baraso has publicly supported multiple Democratic candidates and causes and he has been invited to the White House multiple times. During the 2025 Democratic National Committee chairmanship election, he stated that the party "needs a true leader". In a post on X, he endorsed Martin O'Malley for the position. He also supported Kamala Harris in the 2024 U.S. presidential election.

In an interview with Scripps News in December 2024, De Baraso said that he "has been on the campaign trail with Joe Biden and Kamala Harris since the beginning of 2023" and praised Harris for engaging young voters and for her work on climate change and gun violence prevention. De Baraso also supported Brad Lander in the 2025 New York City Mayoral Election, following Lander's ICE arrest.

Following allegations involving Representative Eric Swalwell in April 2026, De Baraso faced criticism from social media users regarding a TikTok video he filmed with Swalwell. Former U.S. Representative George Santos publicly questioned De Baraso's parents' choices regarding his online political commentary. De Baraso responded on X, defending his family against the criticisms.

In June 2026, De Baraso appeared as a guest on the syndicated radio program The Breakfast Club. During the interview, he discussed left-wing political commentator and Twitch streamer Hasan Piker, stating that Piker "needs to learn how to speak to Black people" and elderly Democratic supporters. Describing his own political alignment as a "social Democrat" positioned "to the left of moderate Democrat,"

== 2024 Democratic National Convention ==
At age twelve, De Baraso attended the 2024 Democratic National Convention in Chicago, as a guest of Jaime Harrison. During the convention, he engaged in a debate with MyPillow CEO Mike Lindell regarding Lindell's claims about the 2020 United States presidential election. De Baraso responded to Lindell's claims with "So your source is, 'Trust me, bro?'" a tagline that was turned into Knowa-related merch.

Late Night with Seth Meyers featured a segment referencing the interaction, and Variety reported that "no social media maven on the ground at the United Center got more of a boost out of the DNC marathon than 12-year-old Knowa De Baraso".

In a separate interaction, De Baraso questioned conservative activist Charlie Kirk regarding his stance on the Civil Rights Act of 1964 with De Baraso adding to his post caption "This man is insane and couldn't even answer the question."
