= Elizabeth Warren 2020 presidential campaign =

American political campaign

- Campaign: 2020 United States presidential election (Democratic Party primaries)
- Candidate: Elizabeth Warren; U. S. Senator from Massachusetts (2013–present)
- Affiliation: Democratic Party
- EC formed: December 31, 2018
- Announced: February 9, 2019
- Suspended: March 5, 2020
- Headquarters: Charlestown, Massachusetts
- Key people: Deb Haaland (National co-chair); Katie Porter (National co-chair); Ayanna Pressley (National co-chair); Roger Lau (campaign manager); Dan Geldon (chief of staff); Caitlin Mitchell (senior digital organizer); Emily Parcell; Joe Rospars (Chief Strategist); Janice Rottenberg; Tessa Simonds; Tracey Lewis; Richard McDaniel; Kane Miller; Brendan Summers
- Slogan(s): "Persist" "Dream Big Fight Hard" "Big, Structural Change" "I have a plan for that" (unofficial slogan)

Website
- elizabethwarren.com (archived - March 4, 2020)

The 2020 presidential campaign of Elizabeth Warren was a campaign from the senior United States senator from Massachusetts. It began with Warren's formal announcement on February 9, 2019, at a rally in Lawrence, Massachusetts, at the site of the 1912 Bread and Roses Strike. The announcement followed widespread speculation that she would run after supporters urged her to run in the 2016 Democratic presidential primaries. In 2018, Warren had been considered a top contender for the 2020 Democratic presidential nomination.

Warren is generally considered a progressive within the Democratic Party. Her political positions include an end to lobbying, a wealth tax and $15 hourly minimum wage within the context of a capitalist economy, single-payer healthcare, canceling student loan debt, and support for the Green New Deal. Polls showed Warren in second or third place, and she briefly challenged Biden and Sanders for frontrunner status in the race.

After a disappointing finish on Super Tuesday, including a third-place result in her home state of Massachusetts, she suspended her campaign on March 5, 2020. Political commentators have attributed her inability to win primary races to the primaries' focus on "electability" in a race against Donald Trump, her popularity peaking too early in the race, and her inability to position herself between progressive and more moderate voters.

== Background ==
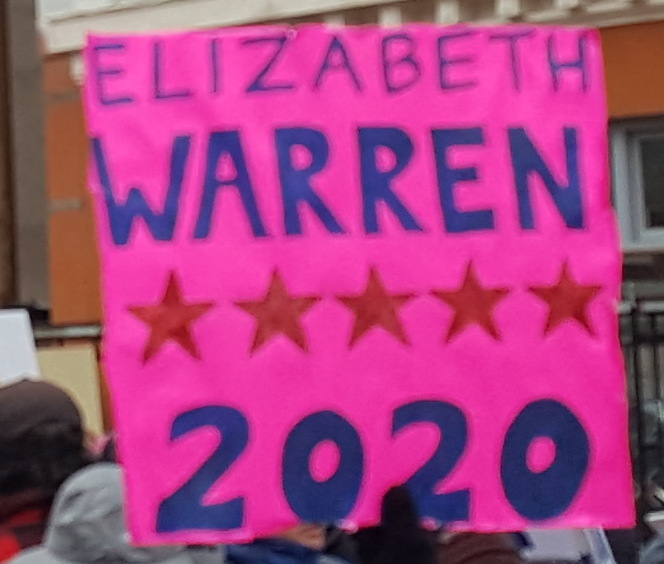
Sign at the Women's March in Portland, 2017, held the day after the inauguration of Donald Trump.

During the run-up to the 2016 presidential elections, Warren was widely believed by political commentators to be planning a run for the Democratic primaries and she was seen as one of the favorites to win the Democratic nomination, due to her popularity among the progressive wing of the party. However, she decided not to enter the race, claiming she "wanted to stay buckled down and keep doing [her] job" in the Senate. Despite this, Warren later stated in an interview with Bloomberg Businessweek on July 25, 2019 that she would have accepted a role on the 2016 Democratic presidential ticket as vice president if nominee Hillary Clinton had offered it to her.

Speculation on a possible 2016 presidential run by Warren continued even after she explicitly denied plans to join the Democratic fray, with headlines such as "Should we believe Elizabeth Warren when she says she won't run for president?" appearing in the press. She stopped short of claiming that she would "never" run for the office of President, paving the way for a future attempt at the White House.

Warren remained formally neutral throughout the 2016 Democratic presidential primary, declining to endorse a candidate. However, in a March 2016 interview Warren remarked that she was, "cheering Bernie [Sanders] on," praising the issues he was raising in his campaign. After Clinton became the presumptive presidential nominee of the Democratic Party, Warren vigorously campaigned for her and took an active role in the 2016 presidential election. She remarked that Donald Trump, the Republican presumptive nominee, was dishonest, uncaring, and "a loser". A Clinton campaign memo obtained by Bloomberg Businessweek confirmed that Warren was one of the people under consideration to be Clinton's choice for vice president, though this ultimately went to Virginia Senator Tim Kaine. In December 2016, Warren gained a seat on the Senate Armed Services Committee, termed by The Boston Globe to be "a high-profile perch on one of the chamber's most powerful committees" which will "fuel speculation about a possible 2020 bid for president".

The media speculation regarding her campaign further increased her profile and widened the appeal of her platform among voters, leading CNBC to claim that she was "the real winner of the 2016 election".

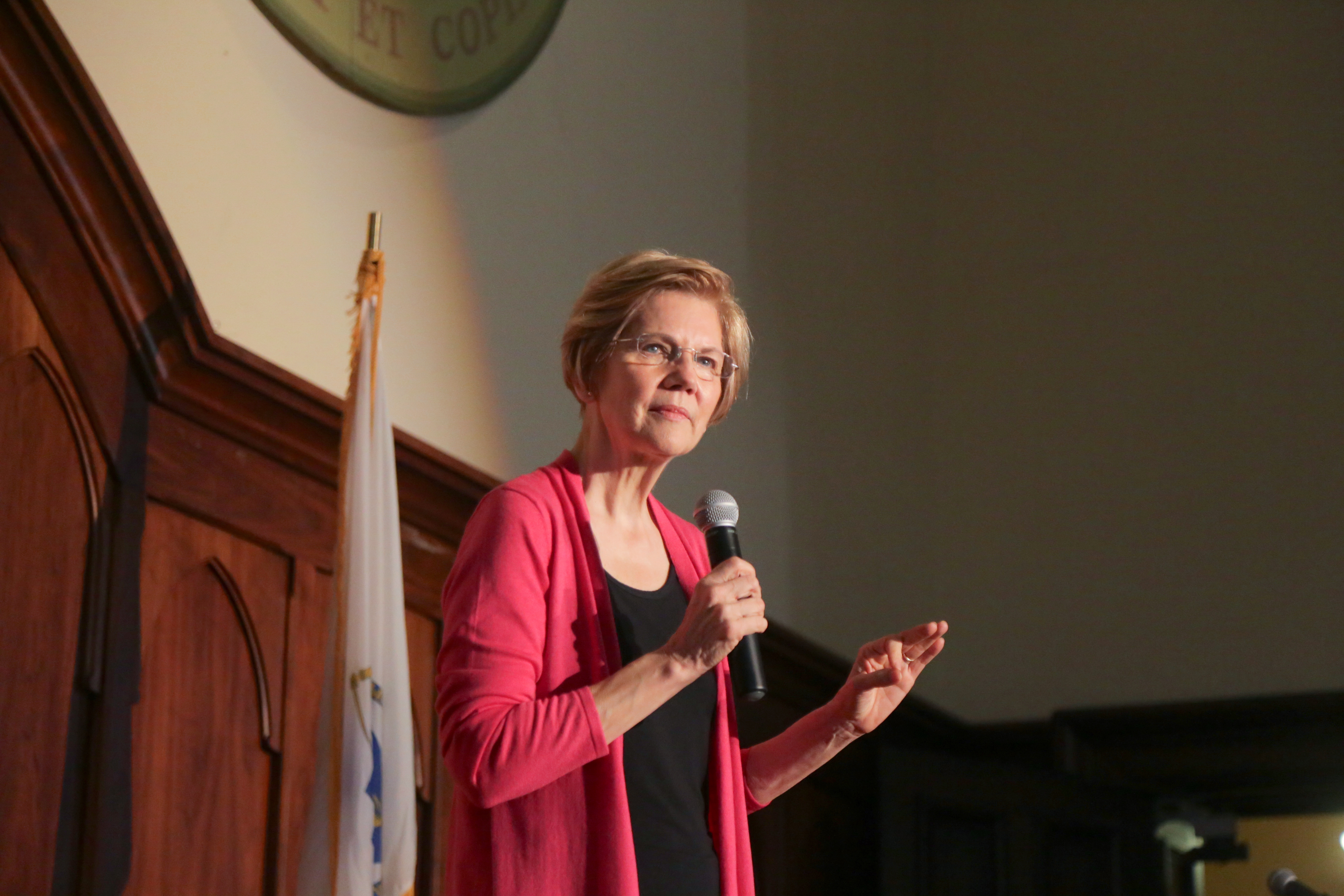
Warren speaking at the September 2018 town hall meeting in Holyoke, Massachusetts where she acknowledged she would consider running for president

Warren was named as part of the "Hell-No Caucus" by Politico in 2018, along with Senators Cory Booker, Kirsten Gillibrand, Kamala Harris, and Bernie Sanders, given she voted "overwhelmingly to thwart his [Trump's] nominees for administration jobs", such as with Rex Tillerson, Betsy DeVos, and Mike Pompeo; all of the Senators in this group were considered potential 2020 presidential contenders at this point in time. At a town hall meeting in Holyoke, Massachusetts on September 29, 2018, Warren said that "[a]fter November 6, I will take a hard look at running for president", referencing the date of the 2018 United States elections in which she was running for reelection to the Senate.

== Campaign ==
=== Exploratory committee ===
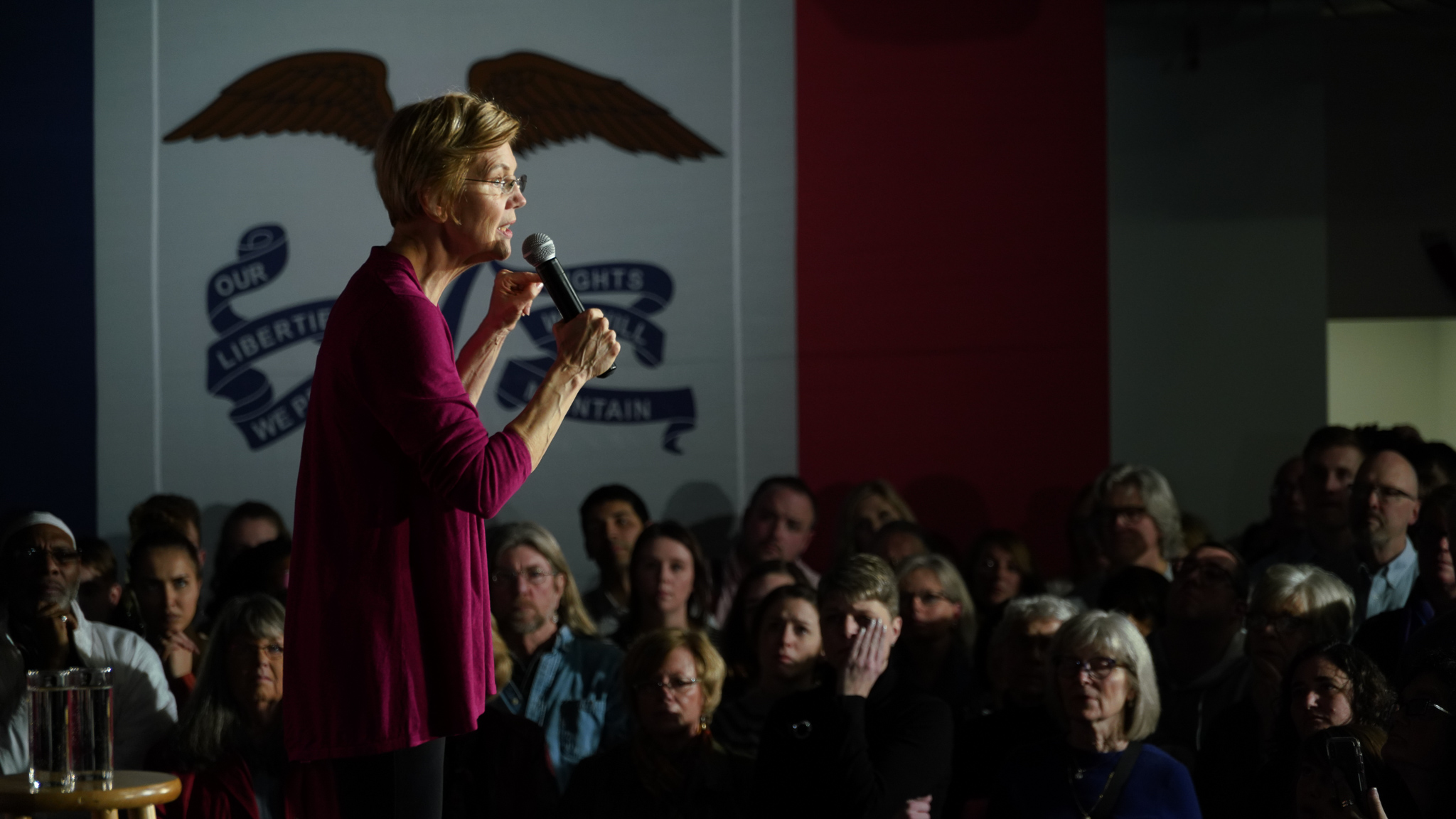
Warren addresses a crowd in Des Moines, Iowa on January 5, 2020

Warren was regarded to be the first major Democratic contender to have announced the formation of an exploratory committee for a 2020 presidential campaign, delivering her announcement in a video on December 30, 2018. In this video, she said that "America's middle class is under attack" in explaining the need for her populist economic agenda, indirectly referring to her recently proposed Accountable Capitalism Act.

News reports soon after the announcement noted that Republicans have often criticized Warren for her liberal economic positions and the controversy around her claim of Native American ancestry; political commentator Peter Beinart wrote that Warren's weak favorability numbers, (Note: A recent poll by Quinnipiac University had measured it at 30%, compared to 37% who expressed an unfavorable view.) reflected "the deeper discomfort that Americans again and again express with ambitious women". Columnist and political commentator Karol Markowicz disagreed with Beinart's view, describing Warren as "stern, abrasive and unfriendly," dismissing claims of sexism.

=== Campaign announcement ===
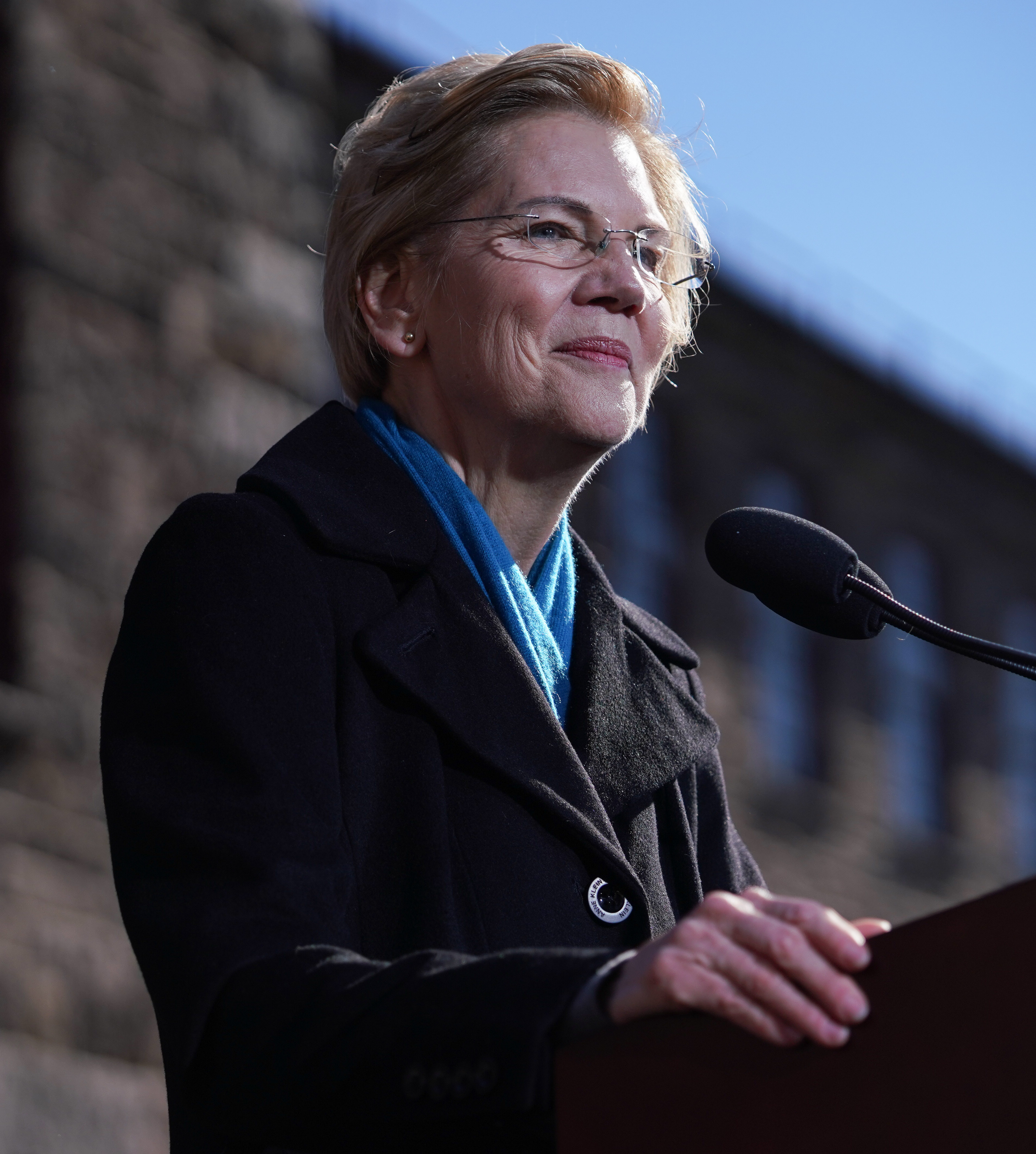
Warren delivering her announcement address on February 9, 2019, at a rally in Lawrence, Massachusetts

On February 9, 2019, Warren officially announced her run at a rally at the Everett Mills in Lawrence, Massachusetts, the site of the 1912 Bread and Roses strike. Warren announced that Roger Lau would serve as her campaign manager, making him the first Asian-American campaign manager for a major American Presidential candidate.

Commenting on her campaign, The New York Times said that Warren "is signaling to party leaders that, far from wanting to stage a 'political revolution' in the fashion of Mr. Sanders, she wants to revive the beleaguered Democratic National Committee and help recapture the Senate while retaining the House in 2020." The Times also wrote that "with phone calls, texts and handwritten notes, the Massachusetts senator is continuing an unusually determined outreach effort to show party officials she is aligned with them" and that "many of the officials she is courting are so-called superdelegates, who are able to cast a binding vote should the primary go beyond a first ballot."

=== Early developments ===
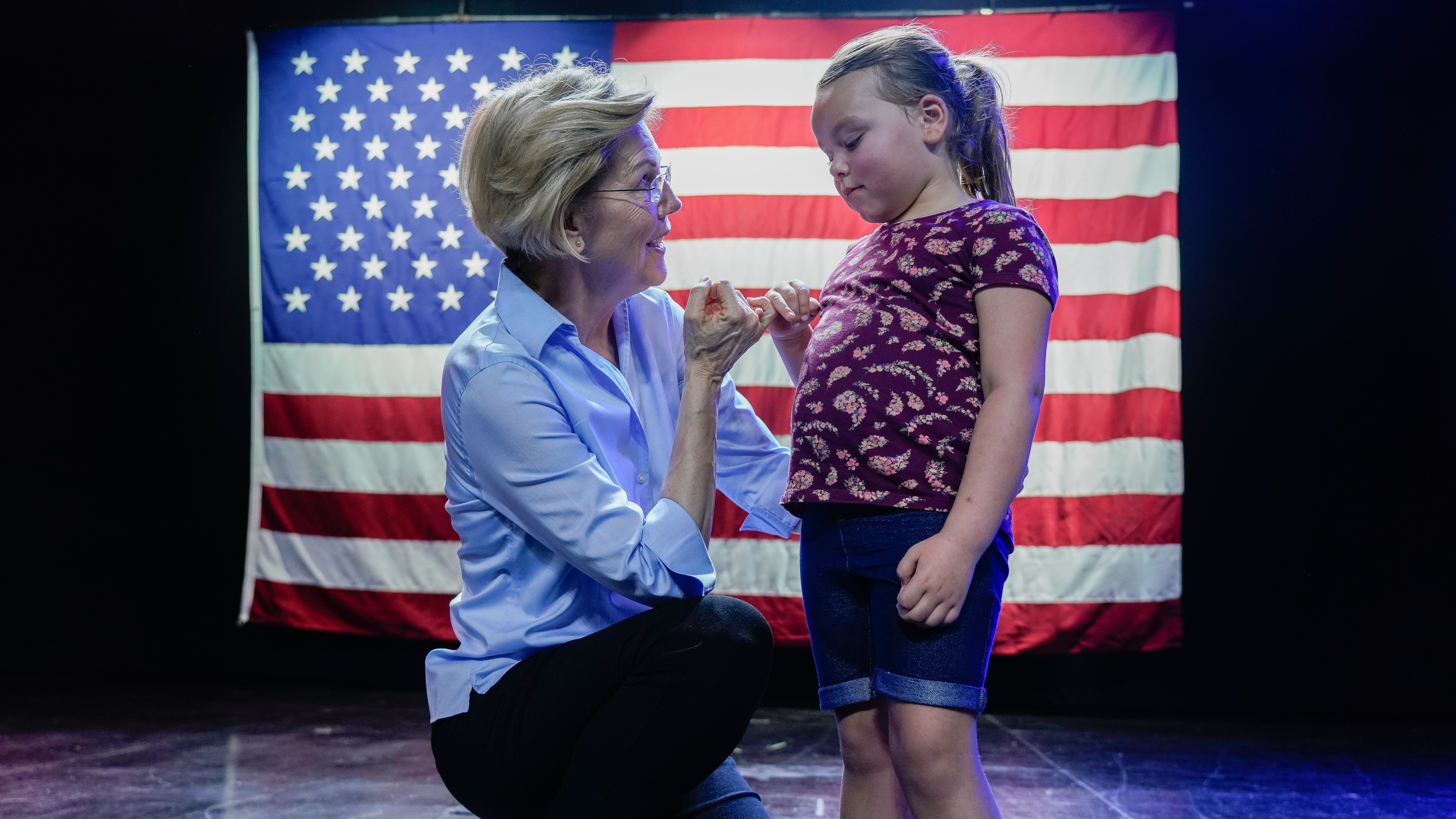
Warren pinky promises with a young girl at a campaign event

Warren instituted a number of traditions at her campaign events. One of them was how she would interact with young girls. She made it a practice to say to young girls, "My name is Elizabeth and I'm running for president, because that's what girls do", before having them make a pinky promise with her to remember what she said. Another practice Warren instituted were so-called "selfie lines", where, at the end of her campaign events, she would take a photo with anyone who waited in line to do so. Her "selfie lines" would sometimes last for hours after her larger rallies.

Due to her many policy proposals, "Warren has a plan for that" became a catch phrase of the campaign

Calling for "big structural change", Warren, during her candidacy, rolled out many detailed policy proposals. Warren became known for the number and depth of her policy proposals. On her campaign website, she detailed more than 45 plans for topics including health care, universal child care, ending the opioid crisis, clean energy, climate change, foreign policy, reducing corporate influence at the Pentagon, and ending "Wall Street's stranglehold on the economy". "Warren has a plan for that" became a meme and catchphrase of the campaign.

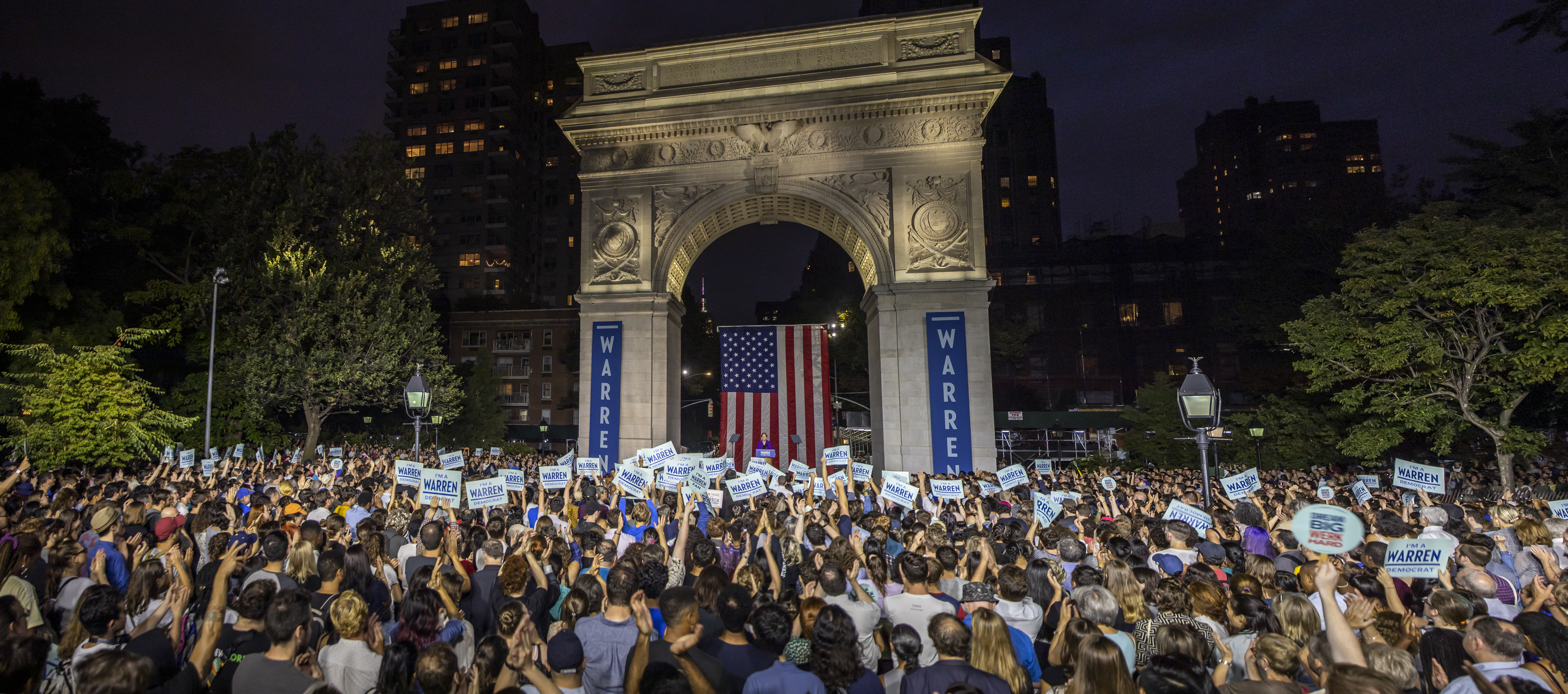
A crowd of an estimated 20,000 people attended Warren's September 16, 2019 rally in New York City's Washington Square Park

In August and September 2019, it was noted in the media that a number of Warren's events had attracted very sizable crowds, including as many as 20,000 at Washington Square Park in New York City, 15,000 in Seattle, and 12,000 in Saint Paul, Minnesota,

In early October 2019, the campaign fired its national organizing director, Rich McDaniel, for allegations of "inappropriate behavior" following an investigation by outside counsel.

In October 2019, Warren was shown to be the leading Democratic presidential contender in the RealClearPolitics polling average, overtaking Joe Biden who had previously been the leading candidate throughout the period the polling average was running. However, Biden would soon retake the top position after Warren's polling averages fell.

During the campaign, Warren asserted that she had been fired from her first teaching job after the school's principal became aware that she was pregnant at the end of the 1971 school year. In October 2019, multiple media outlets discovered school board meeting minutes indicating that Warren's employer had offered her a position for the 1971–1972 school year, and that her resignation was later officially recorded as having been "accepted with regret" by the board. Warren stood by her account. Thomas Kaplan of The New York Times and Tom Kertscher of PolitiFact both noted that in the early-1970s, it was common for women to be pushed out of teaching positions after becoming pregnant. CBS News quoted two individuals who had contemporarily taught at the same school as agreeing that, under the school's practices in the early-1970s, a non-tenured teacher such as Warren would have lost their job at the school due to pregnancy. One of these individuals said that there had been a de facto policy at the school of dismissing teachers who were more than five months pregnant, and that Warren would certainly have been "unwelcome" to continue working at the school due to her pregnancy.

On November 22, 2019, Reps. Ayanna Pressley of Massachusetts, Deb Haaland of New Mexico, and Katie Porter of California (all prominent members of the Congressional Progressive Caucus) were announced as co-chairs of the campaign.

At a December 2018 meeting, Elizabeth Warren and Bernie Sanders had agreed to refrain from attacking each other in the primaries, because both favored similar progressive goals. On January 12, 2020, however, Politico published a Sanders volunteer script allegedly being used in Iowa, giving talking points for a volunteer to attack Warren. On January 13, CNN published a story based on reports from four sources familiar with the December 2018 meeting between Warren and Sanders, reporting that during the meeting Sanders had told Warren that he believed a woman couldn't win election to the presidency in 2020. When asked about this story, Warren said it was true, while Sanders denied that he had said anything resembling the reports. The controversy increased tensions on the campaign trail between the two progressive senators.

In February 2020, six women resigned from Warren's campaign, citing a toxic racial environment and tokenism. Warren apologized, saying she took responsibility and would work with her team to do better. In March 2020, two Nevada campaign insiders said that their local team had failed to "address the culture that led to the women's departures."

=== Primary races ===
A week before the Iowa caucuses, on January 25, 2020, The Des Moines Register endorsed Elizabeth Warren. The newspaper stated that, "[Warren] cares about people, and she will use her seemingly endless energy and passion to fight for them. At this moment, when the fabric of American life is at stake, Elizabeth Warren is the president this nation needs." In the Iowa caucuses, held on February 3, 2020, Warren came in third place, earning eight pledged delegates.

Warren finished in fourth place in the New Hampshire primary held on February 11, 2020. Warren did not meet the 15% eligibility threshold and thus did not earn any delegates.

On Super Tuesday, Warren had a disappointing finish, winning no states and only 57 delegates. In addition, she came in third place in her home state of Massachusetts.

=== Campaign suspension ===
On March 5, 2020, following disappointing results on Super Tuesday, Warren suspended her campaign. Warren did not immediately endorse either of the major candidates remaining, former vice president Joe Biden or U.S. senator Bernie Sanders of Vermont.

Many political strategists theorized why Warren — once considered a front-runner — had struggled to win primary races. An analysis by FiveThirtyEight noted that the 2020 primaries were focused on "electability"; Warren faced unfavorable numbers in hypothetical head-to-head polls against Donald Trump, and Democratic party officials worried that her background as a Harvard Law professor and Massachusetts Senator would not connect with working-class voters in the Midwest. Democratic strategist Joe Trippi compared Warren's early rise to Howard Dean's 2004 campaign, saying that her popularity peaked too early in the race, allowing her to lose ground to other up-and-coming candidates. Political consultant James Carville noted Warren's inability to position herself as a true "progressive" candidate, citing her support for Medicare-for-all while still calling herself a "capitalist". At the same time, Warren's embrace of progressive policies turned off more moderate voters. Ahead of the Iowa caucuses, a Selzer & Company poll found that Warren was the favorite second choice for Pete Buttigieg voters, however, his campaign suspension and subsequent endorsement of Joe Biden swayed would-be moderate Warren voters to switch to Biden.

Warren endorsed Biden after he became the presumptive nominee, following Sanders' campaign suspension and subsequent endorsement of Biden.

== Political positions ==
=== Anti-corruption ===
Warren's campaign website says she will "end lobbying as we know it by closing loopholes so everyone who lobbies must register, shining sunlight on their activities, banning foreign governments from hiring Washington lobbyists, and shutting down the ability of lobbyists to move freely in and out of government jobs." She promises to "shut the revolving door between Wall Street and Washington" by banning Congresspeople from trading stocks while in office and becoming lobbyists once they are out of office. Warren also supports requiring every candidate for federal office to post their tax returns online for public viewing and strengthening the code of ethics for Supreme Court justices and the code of conduct for all other federal judges.

=== Economy ===
A fellow at the Roosevelt Institute sums up Warren's economic ideology as follows:

[W]e should select the tool appropriate to each economic problem we face and not decide ahead of time that the same solution is appropriate.

Warren has rejected the "socialist" label and has said previously she is "a capitalist to [her] bones". She has cosponsored a bill raising the U.S. minimum wage to $15 an hour. She has also stated her openness to universal basic income.

Warren has proposed an economic program based on "economic patriotism," which includes investing $2 trillion in climate-friendly industries, creating a new Department of Economic Development, and implementing measures to support exports. Her plan aims to support American workers and manufacturing, echoing President Trump's goal, but not his means such as tariffs and tight immigration restrictions.

==== Taxes ====
Warren supports an "Ultra-Millionaire Tax" on the 75,000 richest families in the U.S. (those with net worth greater than $50 million) that she says would result in $250 billion a year in federal revenue. She proposes using that extra funding to provide universal childcare and a pre-K program that mirrors the universal high school movement of the early 20th century, relief of student loan debt, and down payments on a Green New Deal and Medicare for All. Additionally, she says a historic investment in housing would result in rents decreasing by 10% nationwide and 1.5 million new jobs.

Former top economic adviser to Obama and both Clintons, Gene Sperling has said "This type of wealth tax is essential." David Leonhardt wrote that "Warren is trying to treat not just the symptoms but the underlying disease."

==== Working class ====
Warren supports transferring corporate power to workers. She considers herself a defender of the middle class, saying in her announcement video that "America's middle class is under attack." Recent legislation she has submitted would make it easier for Americans to form and join labor unions.

She supports and recently introduced legislation requiring U.S. corporations worth more than $1 billion to allow their employees to select 40% of their board of directors. This is an attempt to get more money flowing back into the pockets of regular workers instead of corporate leaders. It would also require that shareholders approve any corporate funds being donated to political candidates.

==== Jobs ====
Warren supports the proposed Green New Deal which Warren states will create jobs and fight climate change. She says some of the extra funding from her proposed tax on "ultra-millionaires" could be used to begin paying for this, as well as using some to create 1.5 million new jobs.

==== Monopolies and government intervention ====
She does not support U.S. government-takeover of certain industries. Instead, she wants to restructure markets, reflecting her view that the economy has been dominated by a select few individuals and that the government can reform it to make it more competitive. Her focus has been specifically on breaking up what, in her view, are monopolies in the technology sector through stronger antitrust enforcement. She has specifically called out Apple, Facebook, Google, and Amazon. She has also pushed for more competition and government involvement in the healthcare industry.

=== Elections ===
Warren supports the passage of an amendment to the U.S. Constitution to "protect the right of every American citizen to vote and have that vote counted." She also supports outlawing "unnecessary and unjustified" regulations that increase the difficulty of voting. She supports a ban on gerrymandering. She has also called for the abolition of the Electoral College in favor of a national popular vote in presidential elections.

Warren also supports overturning the Supreme Court decision on Citizens United v. FEC, outlawing political donations made by federal lobbyists and PACs, and completely banning Super PACs, though late in her campaign, she changed her policy, noting when all the men but none of the women were getting PAC money, it created an uneven playing field.

=== Impeachment ===
Warren was one of the first major candidates to call for the impeachment of President Trump. On April 19, 2019 she tweeted, "The severity of this misconduct demands that elected officials in both parties set aside political considerations and do their constitutional duty. That means the House should initiate impeachment proceedings against the President of the United States."

=== Foreign policy ===
Warren opposes President Trump's renegotiation of the North American Free Trade Agreement, known as the U.S.-Mexico-Canada Agreement, "unless he produces a better deal for America's working families".

Warren acknowledges the need for a strong military for deterrent purposes, and says the U.S. must maintain vigilance regarding the threat of terrorism, but she says she wants to bring the troops home. She says in doing so, the U.S. government must ensure they get the support and benefits they're owed. She also says she supports "cutting our bloated defense budget" and cutting the hold by defense contractors on military policy. She opposes "endless wars".

She advocates "reinvesting in diplomacy" and multilateralism on issues of shared interests with allies. Warren has stated that "no foreign country should be able to purchase farmland in America," which she claims are dominating the United States agricultural sector.

=== Housing ===
Warren supports federal funding for the construction of millions of new homes. She has also introduced legislation that would reward local governments for relaxing restrictive zoning codes that prevent the building of new homes. The plan also calls for further investment in affordable-housing projects, with a specific focus on assisting black families who have historically been hurt by federal housing guidelines.

She says some of the extra funding from her proposed tax on "ultra-millionaires" could be used to begin lowering rents.

=== Healthcare ===
Warren supports a proposal by Senator Bernie Sanders that would require the U.S. government to provide health insurance to every U.S. citizen, a program known as Medicare for All. On November 1, 2019 Warren released a detailed plan of how she proposes paying for Medicare for All.

==== Drug costs ====
Warren has advocated for the U.S. government to begin producing prescription drugs as a way to lower drug costs in the U.S. She has introduced legislation that would give the government the ability to produce generic versions of certain drugs, the name-brand versions of which are much more expensive.

==== Opioid epidemic response ====
In response to the national opioid epidemic, Warren has called for the U.S. government to assist in the treatment of more addicted Americans. Additionally, her plan calls for $100 billion in federal funds to be directed into fighting the opioid crisis over 10 years.

=== Judicial issues ===
==== Criminal justice reform ====
Warren supports criminal justice reform stopping racial disparity in the justice system, banning private prisons, utilizing community policing, and demilitarizing local police departments. She also supports comprehensive sentencing reform and the legalization of marijuana.

==== Economic crime ====
Warren was a major player in the establishment of the Consumer Financial Protection Bureau. She is expected to highlight related legislation she has introduced to further eliminate white-collar crime. One such bill would create a law enforcement unit to specifically investigate crimes at big banks and financial institutions. It would also require senior executives of banks with more than $10 billion in assets to certify each year that they "found no criminal conduct or civil fraud within the financial institutions."

Warren has also introduced legislation with Republican Senator James Lankford (OK) requiring federal agencies to release more information in regards to closed federal investigations and cases against bad corporate actors.

Warren supports "new laws and a new commitment" to investigating and prosecuting large corporations and their leaders. She emphasizes the protection of customers and workers and stopping monopolies from forming.
