= 2020 Massachusetts Democratic presidential primary =

- March 3, 2020

114 delegates (91 pledged, 23 unpledged) to the Democratic National Convention The number of pledged delegates won is determined by the popular vote

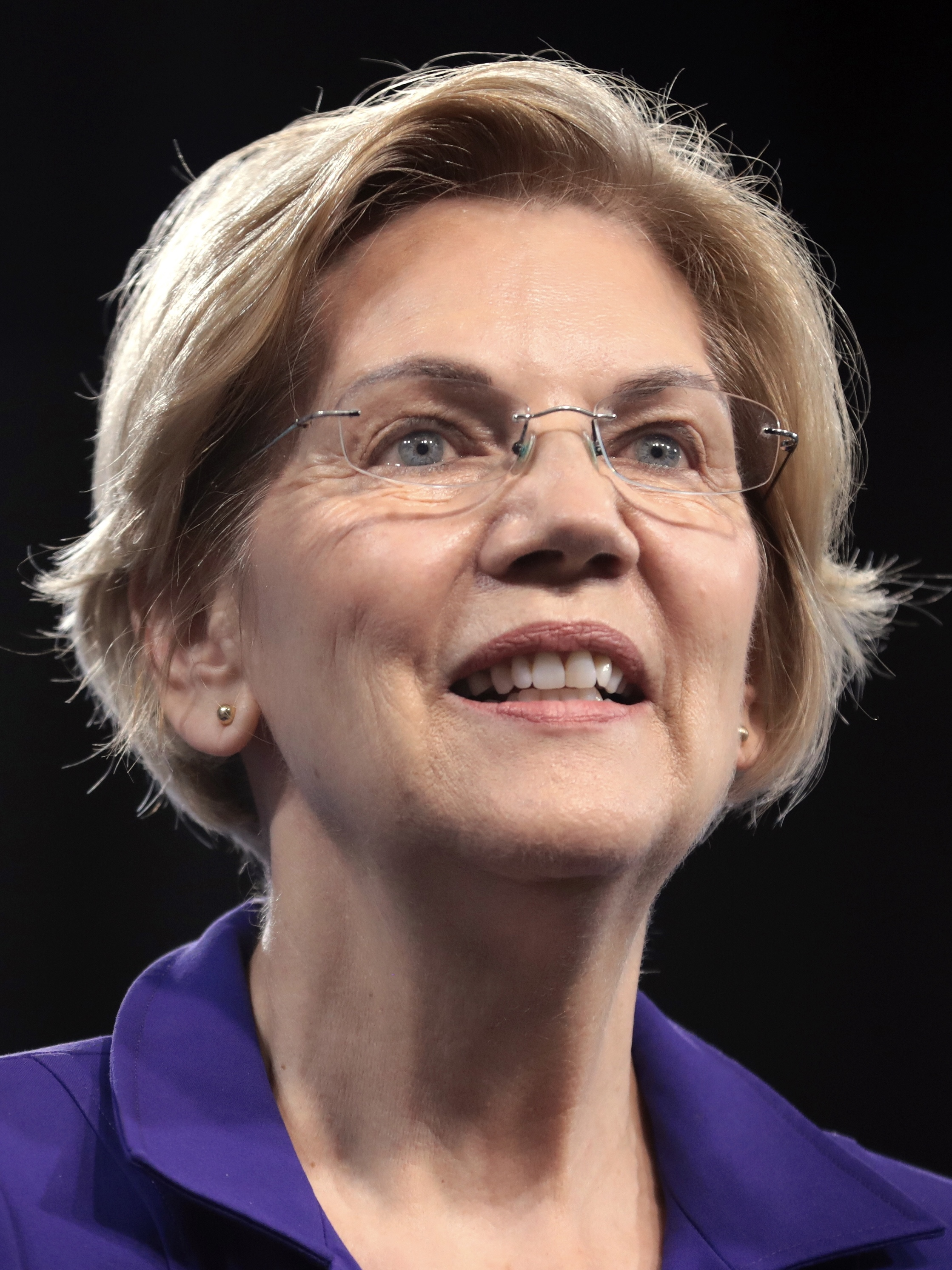

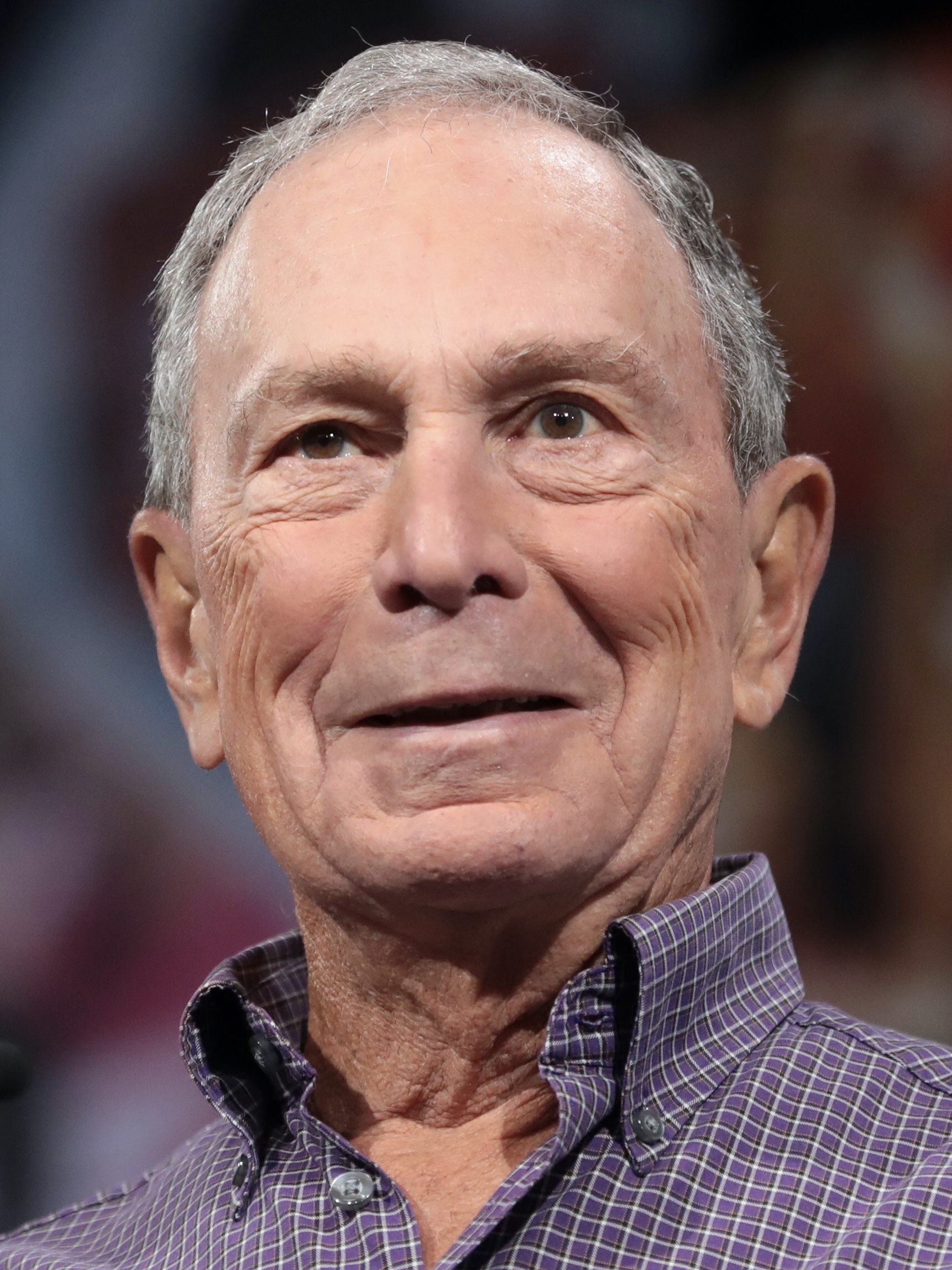
Candidate	Joe Biden	Bernie Sanders
Home state	Delaware	Vermont
Delegate count	37	30
Popular vote	473,861	376,990
Percentage	33.41%	26.58%
Candidate	Elizabeth Warren	Michael Bloomberg
Home state	Massachusetts	New York
Delegate count	24	0
Popular vote	303,864	166,200
Percentage	21.43%	11.72%

Biden
30 – 40%
Sanders
30 – 40%
40 – 50%
Municipality results
Joe Biden	Elizabeth Warren
Bernie Sanders	Tie	N/A

The 2020 Massachusetts Democratic presidential primary took place on March 3, as one of 15 contests scheduled on Super Tuesday in the Democratic Party primaries for the 2020 presidential election, following the South Carolina primary the weekend before. The Massachusetts primary was a semi-closed primary, with the state awarding 114 delegates towards the 2020 Democratic National Convention, of which 91 were pledged delegates allocated on the basis of the results of the primary.

While senators Bernie Sanders and Elizabeth Warren had been projected in all pre-election polls and forecasts to compete for victory till the last day, former vice president Joe Biden won by a large margin with over 33% of the vote and 37 delegates, continuing his string of Super Tuesday victories. Sanders finished behind in second place with nearly 27% and 30 delegates, while Warren's third-place finish in her home state with around 21% of the vote and 24 delegates was regarded the final crush to her candidacy. Former mayor Michael Bloomberg did not win any delegates.

== Procedure ==
Massachusetts was one of 14 states and one territory holding primaries on March 3, 2020, also known as "Super Tuesday". Voting took place throughout the state from 7:00 a.m. until 8:00 p.m. in much of the state, with some precincts opening at 5:45 a.m. In the semi-closed primary, candidates had to meet a threshold of 15 percent at the congressional district or statewide level to be considered viable. The 91 pledged delegates to the 2020 Democratic National Convention were allocated proportionally on the basis of the results of the primary. Of these, between 6 and 8 were allocated to each of the state's 9 congressional districts and another 12 were allocated to party leaders and elected officials (PLEO delegates), in addition to 20 at-large delegates.). The Super Tuesday primary as part of Stage I on the primary timetable received no bonus delegates, in order to disperse the primaries between more different date clusters and keep too many states from hoarding on the first shared date or on a March date in general.

After congressional district caucuses on April 25, 2020, during which national convention district delegates were selected, the state party committee met on May 16, 2020, and voted on the 20 at-large and 12 pledged PLEO delegates for the Democratic National Convention. The delegation was joined by 23 unpledged PLEO delegates: 9 members of the Democratic National Committee, 11 members of Congress (both senators, notably Elizabeth Warren, and 9 representatives, including former candidate Seth Moulton), as well as former DNC chairs Steven Grossman, Debra DeLee, and Paul G. Kirk.

Pledged national convention delegates
Type	Del.	Type	Del.
CD1	6	CD6	6
CD2	6	CD7	8
CD3	6	CD8	7
CD4	6	CD9	6
CD5	8	CD9	6
PLEO	12	At-large	20
Total pledged delegates			91

== Candidates ==
The Massachusetts Secretary of the Commonwealth released the following list of candidates on the ballot:

Running

- Joe Biden
- Michael Bloomberg
- Tulsi Gabbard
- Bernie Sanders
- Elizabeth Warren

Withdrawn

- Michael Bennet
- Cory Booker
- Pete Buttigieg (Note: Candidate withdrew after early voting started, but before the date of the election.)
- Julian Castro
- John Delaney
- Amy Klobuchar
- Deval Patrick
- Tom Steyer
- Marianne Williamson
- Andrew Yang

There were also a write-in option and a "no preference" option on the ballot.

== Polling ==
Polling Aggregation
Source of poll aggregation	Date updated	Dates polled	Bernie Sanders	Elizabeth Warren	Joe Biden	Michael Bloomberg	Tulsi Gabbard	Others/ Undecided (Note: Calculated by subtracting polled candidates from 100%)
270 to Win	March 3, 2020	Until March 3, 2020	22.4%	21.0%	15.0%	13.6%	1.8%	26.2%
FiveThirtyEight	March 3, 2020	until March 3, 2020 (Note: FiveThirtyEight aggregates polls with a trendline regression of polls rather than a strict average of recent polls.)	24.4%	21.0%	18.1%	14.5%	0.4%	21.6%
Average			23.4%	21.0%	16.6%	14.0%	1.1%	23.9%
Massachusetts primary results (March 3, 2020)			26.6%	21.4%	33.4%	11.7%	0.7%	6.1%

Tabulation of individual polls of the 2020 Massachusetts Democratic Primary
Poll source	Date(s) administered	Sample size (Note: Key: A – all adults RV – registered voters LV – likely voters V – unclear)	Margin of error	Joe Biden	Michael Bloomberg	Cory Booker	Pete Buttigieg	Kamala Harris	Amy Klobuchar	Beto O'Rourke	Deval Patrick	Bernie Sanders	Elizabeth Warren	Other	Undecided
	Mar 2, 2020	Klobuchar withdraws from the race; endorses Biden													
Swayable	Mar 1–2, 2020	917 (LV)	± 4.0%	17%	18%	–	11%	–	5%	–	–	27%	15%	8% (Note: Steyer with 4%; Gabbard with 1%; "Other" with 3%)	–
Data for Progress	Feb 28–Mar 2, 2020	301 (LV)	± 5.6%	26%	15%	–	2%	–	1%	–	–	26%	28%	2% (Note: Gabbard with 2%)	–
	Mar 1, 2020	Buttigieg withdraws from the race; endorses Biden													
Suffolk University/Boston Globe/WBZ-TV	Feb 26–29, 2020	500 (LV)	-	11.0%	13.0%	–	12.4%	–	5.0%	–	–	24.2%	22.2%	3.6% (Note: Steyer with 2.4%; Gabbard with 0.8%; refused with 0.4%)	8.6%
WBUR/MassINC	Feb 23–26, 2020	426 (LV)	± 4.9%	9%	13%	-	14%	-	6%	-	-	25%	17%	9% (Note: Gabbard with 1%; Steyer with 2%; Would not vote with 2%)	8%
UMass Amherst	Feb 18–24, 2020	400 (LV)	± 5.9%	12%	9%	-	14%	-	7%	-	-	25%	23%	8% (Note: Gabbard with 4%; Steyer with 3%)	3%
Falchuk & DiNatale	Feb 16–18, 2020	453 (LV)	–	13%	13%	–	13%	–	14%	–	–	17%	16%	5% (Note: Gabbard with 3%; Steyer with 2%)	8%
University of Massachusetts Lowell	Feb 12–19, 2020	450 (LV)	± 6.1%	14%	12%	–	15%	–	9%	–	–	21%	20%	6% (Note: Gabbard with 3%; Steyer with 2%; "Another candidate" with 1%)	4%
	Feb 12, 2020	Patrick withdraws from the race													
Falchuk & DiNatale	Jan 27–30, 2020	334 (LV)	–	16%	8%	–	6%	–	7%	–	3%	12%	23%	7% (Note: Steyer with 4%; Yang with 3%; Booker with 0%)	–
	Jan 13, 2020	Booker withdraws from the race													
	Dec 3, 2019	Harris withdraws from the race													
	Nov 24, 2019	Bloomberg announces his candidacy													
	Nov 14, 2019	Patrick announces his candidacy													
	Nov 1, 2019	O'Rourke withdraws from the race													
WBUR	Oct 16–20, 2019	456	± 4.6%	18%	–	0%	7%	3%	1%	0%	–	13%	33%	7% (Note: Gabbard with 2%; Delaney, Steyer and Yang with 1%; Bennet, Bullock, Castro, Messam, Ryan, Sestak, and Williamson with 0%; others with 2%; would not vote with 2%)	15%
Suffolk University	Sep 3–5, 2019	500	-	26%	–	1%	5%	3%	0%	1%	–	8%	24%	6% (Note: Gabbard with 2%; Bennet, Bullock and Yang with 1%; de Blasio, Castro, Delaney, Messam, Ryan, Sestak, Steyer and Williamson with 0%; refused with 1%)	25%
	Aug 23, 2019	Moulton withdraws from the race													
Suffolk University	Jun 5–9, 2019	370	± 5.1%	22%	–	1%	8%	5%	0%	1%	–	6%	10%	5% (Note: Gabbard, Moulton, and Yang with 1%; Bennet, Bullock, Castro, de Blasio, Delaney, Gillibrand, Gravel, Hickenlooper, Inslee, Klobuchar, Messam, Ryan, Swalwell, and Williamson with 0%; others with 1%)	42%
	Apr 25, 2019	Biden announces his candidacy													
	Apr 22, 2019	Moulton announces his candidacy													
	Apr 14, 2019	Buttigieg announces his candidacy													
Emerson College	Apr 4–7, 2019	371	± 5.0%	23%	–	2%	11%	7%	2%	8%	–	26%	14%	8% (Note: Castro, Delaney, Gabbard, and Yang with 1%; Gillibrand and Inslee with 0%; others with 5%)	–
	Mar 14, 2019	O'Rourke announces his candidacy													
	Feb 19, 2019	Sanders announces his candidacy													
	Feb 10, 2019	Klobuchar announces her candidacy													
	Feb 9, 2019	Warren announces her candidacy													
	Feb 1, 2019	Booker announces his candidacy													
	Jan 21, 2019	Harris announces her candidacy													
YouGov/UMass Amherst	Nov 7–14, 2018	655	–	19%	–	3%	–	6%	3%	10%	6%	14%	11%	1% (Note: Moulton with 1%)	27%

Hypothetical polling with only Biden, Sanders and Warren
Poll source	Date(s) administered	Sample size	Margin of error	Joe Biden	Bernie Sanders	Elizabeth Warren	Undecided
Evan Falchuk and Lou DiNatalie/Commonwealth Magazine	Oct 23–25, 2019	443 (LV)	–	35%	13%	41%	11%

== Results ==
2020 Massachusetts Democratic presidential primary
Candidate	Votes	%	Delegates
Joe Biden	473,861	33.41	37
Bernie Sanders	376,990	26.58	30
Elizabeth Warren	303,864	21.43	24
Michael Bloomberg	166,200	11.72	
Pete Buttigieg (withdrawn)	38,400	2.71	
Amy Klobuchar (withdrawn)	17,297	1.22	
Tulsi Gabbard	10,548	0.74	
Deval Patrick (withdrawn)	6,923	0.49	
Tom Steyer (withdrawn)	6,762	0.48	
Andrew Yang (withdrawn)	2,708	0.19	
Michael Bennet (withdrawn)	1,257	0.09	
John Delaney (withdrawn)	675	0.05	
Marianne Williamson (withdrawn)	617	0.04	
Cory Booker (withdrawn)	426	0.03	
Julian Castro (withdrawn)	305	0.02	
All Others	1,941	0.14	
No Preference	5,345	0.38	
Blank ballots	4,061	0.29	
Total	1,418,180	100%	91

=== Results by county ===
2020 Massachusetts Democratic primary (results per county)
County	Joe Biden		Bernie Sanders		Elizabeth Warren		Michael Bloomberg		Pete Buttigieg		Amy Klobuchar		Tulsi Gabbard		Deval Patrick		Tom Steyer		Andrew Yang		Michael Bennet		John Delaney		Marianne Williamson		Cory Booker		Julian Castro		No Preference		Blank ballots		All Others		Total votes cast
County	Votes	%	Votes	%	Votes	%	Votes	%	Votes	%	Votes	%	Votes	%	Votes	%	Votes	%	Votes	%	Votes	%	Votes	%	Votes	%	Votes	%	Votes	%	Votes	%	Votes	%	Votes	%	Total votes cast
Barnstable	21,423	38.44	12,106	21.72	9,399	16.86	8,011	14.37	2,177	3.91	1,056	1.89	388	0.70	213	0.38	426	0.76	86	0.15	45	0.08	18	0.03	31	0.06	13	0.02	2	0.00	186	0.33	103	0.18	51	0.09	55,734
Berkshire	10,978	38.35	8,196	28.63	5,549	19.38	2,634	9.20	461	1.61	227	0.79	115	0.40	210	0.73	28	0.10	26	0.09	15	0.05	11	0.04	13	0.05	6	0.02	11	0.04	80	0.28	44	0.15	22	0.08	28,626
Bristol	29,181	36.91	22,885	28.94	10,606	13.41	10,350	13.09	2,196	2.78	818	1.03	635	0.80	547	0.69	488	0.62	120	0.15	88	0.11	46	0.06	44	0.06	37	0.05	25	0.03	504	0.64	307	0.39	189	0.24	79,066
Dukes	1,962	32.63	1,632	27.15	1,287	21.41	718	11.94	192	3.19	99	1.65	36	0.60	19	0.32	30	0.50	8	0.13	5	0.08	0	0.00	3	0.05	2	0.03	1	0.02	7	0.12	6	0.10	5	0.08	6,012
Essex	52,900	33.97	41,877	26.89	28,220	18.12	20,661	13.27	4,761	3.06	2,111	1.36	1,482	0.95	852	0.55	890	0.57	264	0.17	167	0.11	79	0.05	67	0.04	49	0.03	48	0.03	586	0.38	445	0.29	268	0.17	155,727
Franklin	4,804	23.54	8,185	40.11	5,159	25.28	1,274	6.24	305	1.49	159	0.78	161	0.79	84	0.41	66	0.32	42	0.21	8	0.04	47	0.23	10	0.05	2	0.01	1	0.00	44	0.22	44	0.22	13	0.06	20,408
Hampden	23,009	36.60	19,260	30.63	8,599	13.68	7,860	12.50	1,170	1.86	599	0.95	484	0.77	537	0.85	141	0.22	118	0.19	165	0.26	62	0.10	30	0.05	28	0.04	44	0.07	319	0.51	257	0.41	189	0.30	62,871
Hampshire	10,722	24.35	15,318	34.78	12,986	29.49	3,052	6.93	721	1.64	426	0.97	231	0.52	141	0.32	57	0.13	58	0.13	17	0.04	9	0.02	16	0.04	8	0.02	6	0.01	146	0.33	86	0.20	41	0.09	44,041
Middlesex	123,553	30.54	99,704	24.64	109,318	27.02	45,727	11.30	11,302	2.79	5,328	1.32	2,733	0.68	1,374	0.34	1,517	0.37	895	0.22	255	0.06	136	0.03	124	0.03	102	0.03	49	0.01	1,269	0.31	827	0.20	404	0.10	404,617
Nantucket	1,055	40.56	624	23.99	384	14.76	373	14.34	66	2.54	35	1.35	15	0.58	9	0.35	17	0.65	4	0.15	2	0.08	4	0.15	1	0.04	0	0.00	0	0.00	9	0.35	2	0.08	1	0.04	2,601
Norfolk	61,914	37.02	36,074	21.57	34,126	20.40	23,101	13.81	4,791	2.86	2,317	1.39	1,352	0.81	658	0.39	862	0.52	345	0.21	102	0.06	55	0.03	68	0.04	42	0.03	11	0.01	694	0.41	467	0.28	275	0.16	167,254
Plymouth	37,270	38.64	23,254	24.11	14,214	14.74	13,390	13.88	3,352	3.48	1,400	1.45	933	0.97	566	0.59	789	0.82	164	0.17	60	0.06	53	0.05	59	0.06	33	0.03	19	0.02	468	0.49	306	0.32	127	0.13	96,457
Suffolk	47,608	29.79	48,636	30.43	41,885	26.21	13,745	8.60	2,513	1.57	965	0.60	819	0.51	974	0.61	377	0.24	312	0.20	213	0.13	103	0.06	70	0.04	59	0.04	52	0.03	464	0.29	818	0.51	196	0.12	159,809
Worcester	47,482	35.18	39,239	29.08	22,132	16.40	15,304	11.34	4,393	3.26	1,757	1.30	1,164	0.86	739	0.55	1,074	0.80	266	0.20	115	0.09	52	0.04	81	0.06	45	0.03	36	0.03	569	0.42	349	0.26	160	0.12	134,957
Total	473,861	33.41	376,990	26.58	303,864	21.43	166,200	11.72	38,400	2.71	17,297	1.22	10,548	0.74	6,923	0.49	6,762	0.48	2,708	0.19	1,257	0.09	675	0.05	617	0.04	426	0.03	305	0.02	5,345	0.38	4,061	0.29	1,941	0.14	1,418,180

== Analysis ==
Share of the vote by city and town

According to exit polls, Biden overwhelmingly won voters over 50, followed by Warren, while Sanders did the same with voters under 40. Voters between the ages of 40 and 49 years old were split between Biden (32%) and Sanders (31%). Biden also won white voters by 8 points over Sanders and African-American voters by 7 points, while Sanders won the Hispanic/Latino vote over Biden by 13 points. Sanders also won the LGBTQ+ voters over Warren and Biden by 12 and 23 points respectively.

Biden carried 7 of the state's 9 congressional districts: the 1st, 3rd, 4th (where Biden got his widest margin of victory), 5th, 6th, 8th, and the 9th. Sanders carried the remaining districts. The one comprised by the Boston-Metro Area showed the best performance for Sanders, and was the only district where Warren finished second. This was a change from the pre-election prediction that Biden would do better in this district and Sanders worse.

== Notes ==
Polling Notes

== See also ==
- 2020 Massachusetts Republican presidential primary
- Spoiler effect
- Split vote
