= Roger Lau =

American political campaign manager

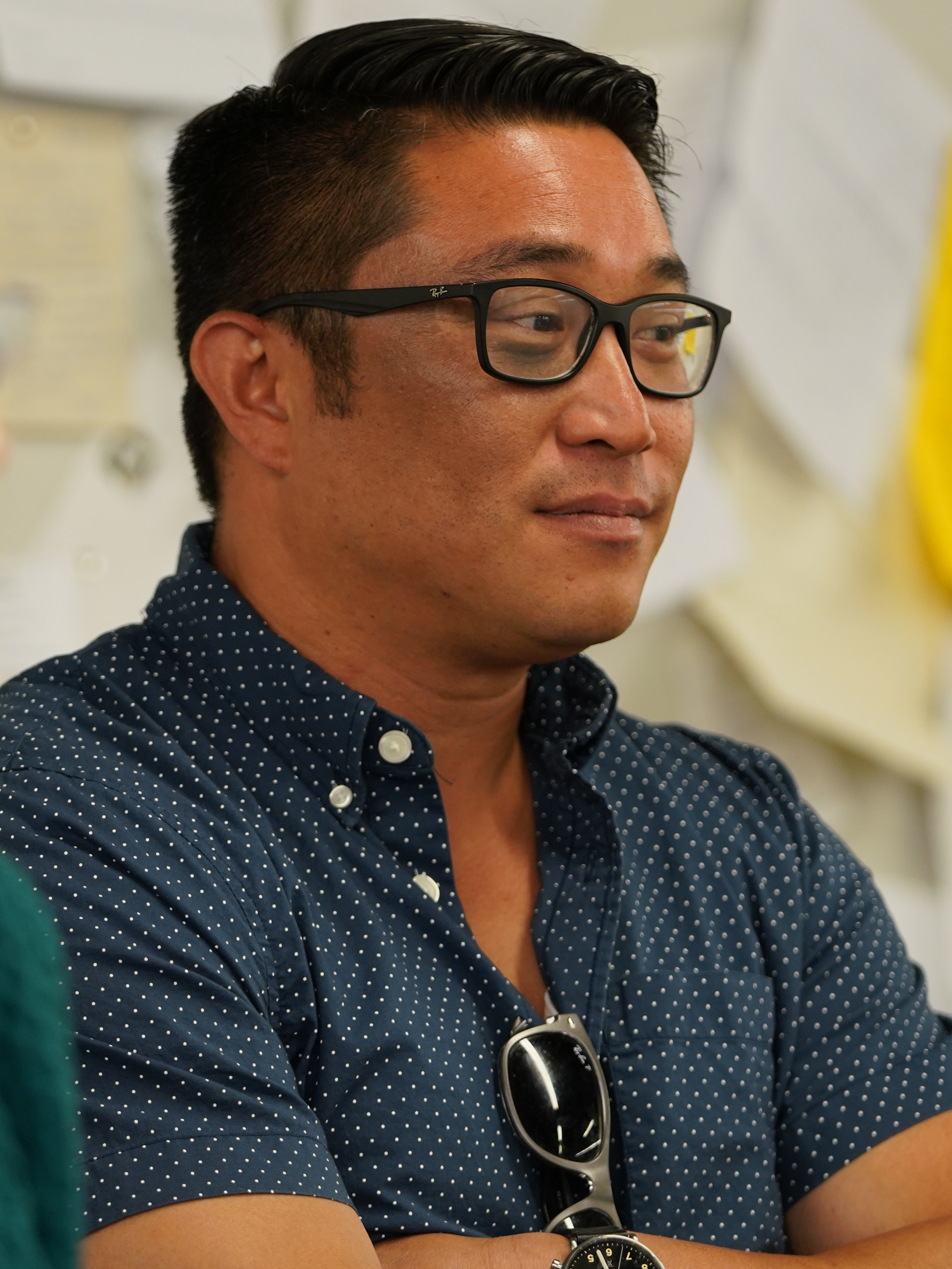

Executive Director of the Democratic National Committee
- Incumbent
- Assumed office March 2025
- Preceded by: Sam Cornale

Deputy Executive Director of the Democratic National Committee
- Incumbent
- Assumed office February 2021
- Preceded by: Vacant
- Succeeded by: Libby Schneider

Personal details
- Born: 1977 (age 48–49) New York City, U.S.
- Party: Democratic
- Education: University of Massachusetts, Amherst (BA)

Roger Lau
- Traditional Chinese: 劉煒
- Simplified Chinese: 刘炜
Transcriptions
Standard Mandarin
- Hanyu Pinyin: Liú Wěi
Yue: Cantonese
- Jyutping: Lau^{4} Wai^{3}

Roger Lau (born in 1977) is an American political consultant who served as the campaign manager for Elizabeth Warren's 2020 presidential campaign. Lau is the executive director of the Democratic National Committee.

== Early life ==
Lau was born in Woodside, Queens, New York to parents from Guangzhou, China. He has two brothers. His parents worked many jobs including driving instructors, takeout restaurant owners, etc. He attended the Bronx High School of Science but dropped out. After receiving a GED, he went to the University of Massachusetts Amherst where he majored in political science and minored in Chinese. While at UMass, he interned for John Kerry. Lau graduated in 2000, and planned to return to New York; instead he was hired by John Kerry's staff and asked for a job working with constituents.

== Career ==
Lau started his career working with Kerry, including his 2004 presidential campaign. While working on the campaign, he met former United States president Bill Clinton and United States Senator Hillary Clinton, for whom he now provides consultancy on Massachusetts-related politics. He also worked on Kerry's 2008 U.S. Senate re-election campaign.

Lau briefly worked in the United States Department of Commerce for President Barack Obama.

After the death of Ted Kennedy and the Democrats’ loss of the Senate seat in the subsequent special election, Lau led the victorious 2012 Senate campaign of Elizabeth Warren. He would then serve as her state director and later go on to manage her 2020 presidential campaign.

In 2021, Lau was named Deputy Executive Director of the Democratic National Committee.

In 2025, Lau was named Executive Director of the Democratic National Committee.

== Personal life ==
Lau is partnered with Amanda Coulombe, a political field organizer who emphasizes technology, and they reside in Somerville, Massachusetts.
