= 2025 Democratic National Committee chairmanship election =

- February 1, 2025

448 members of the DNC who will vote 224.5 votes needed to win

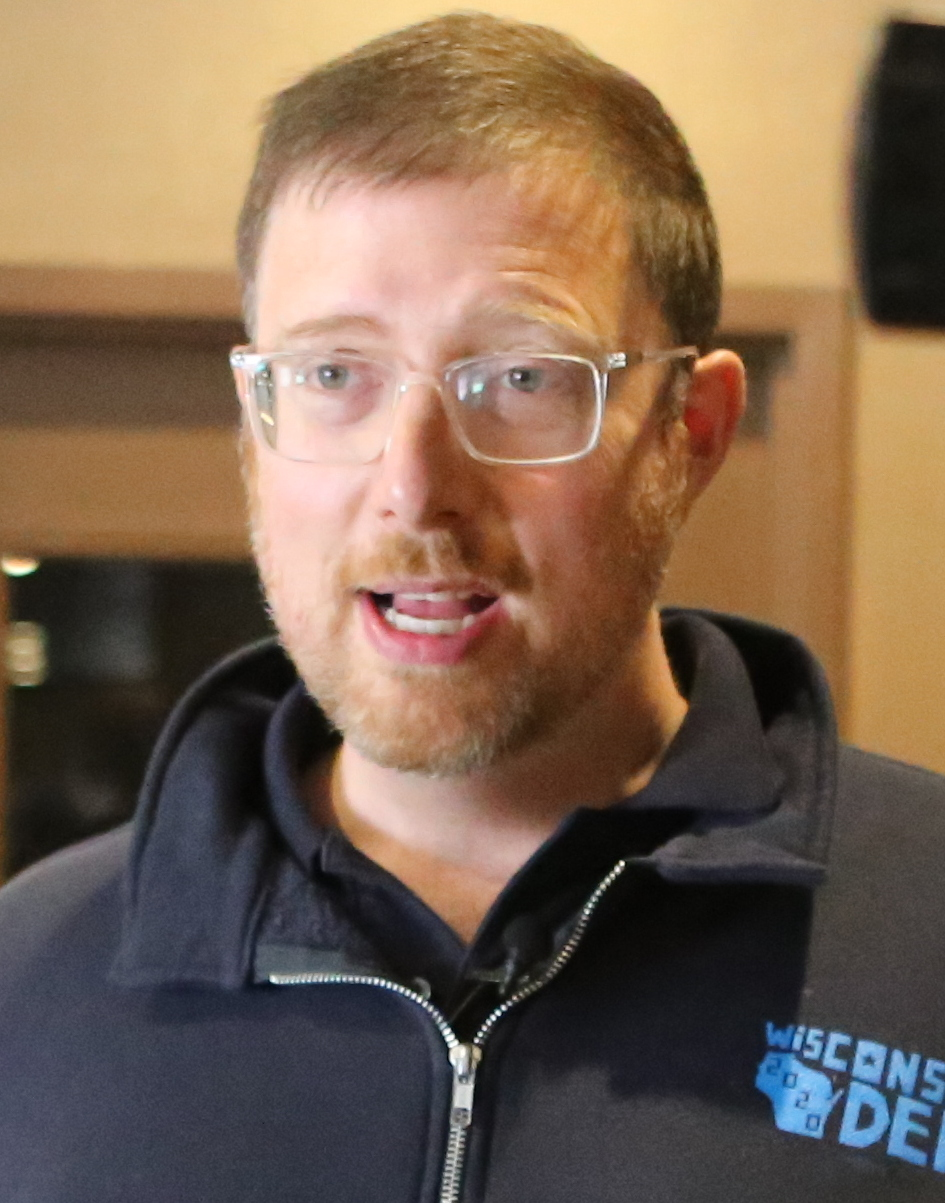

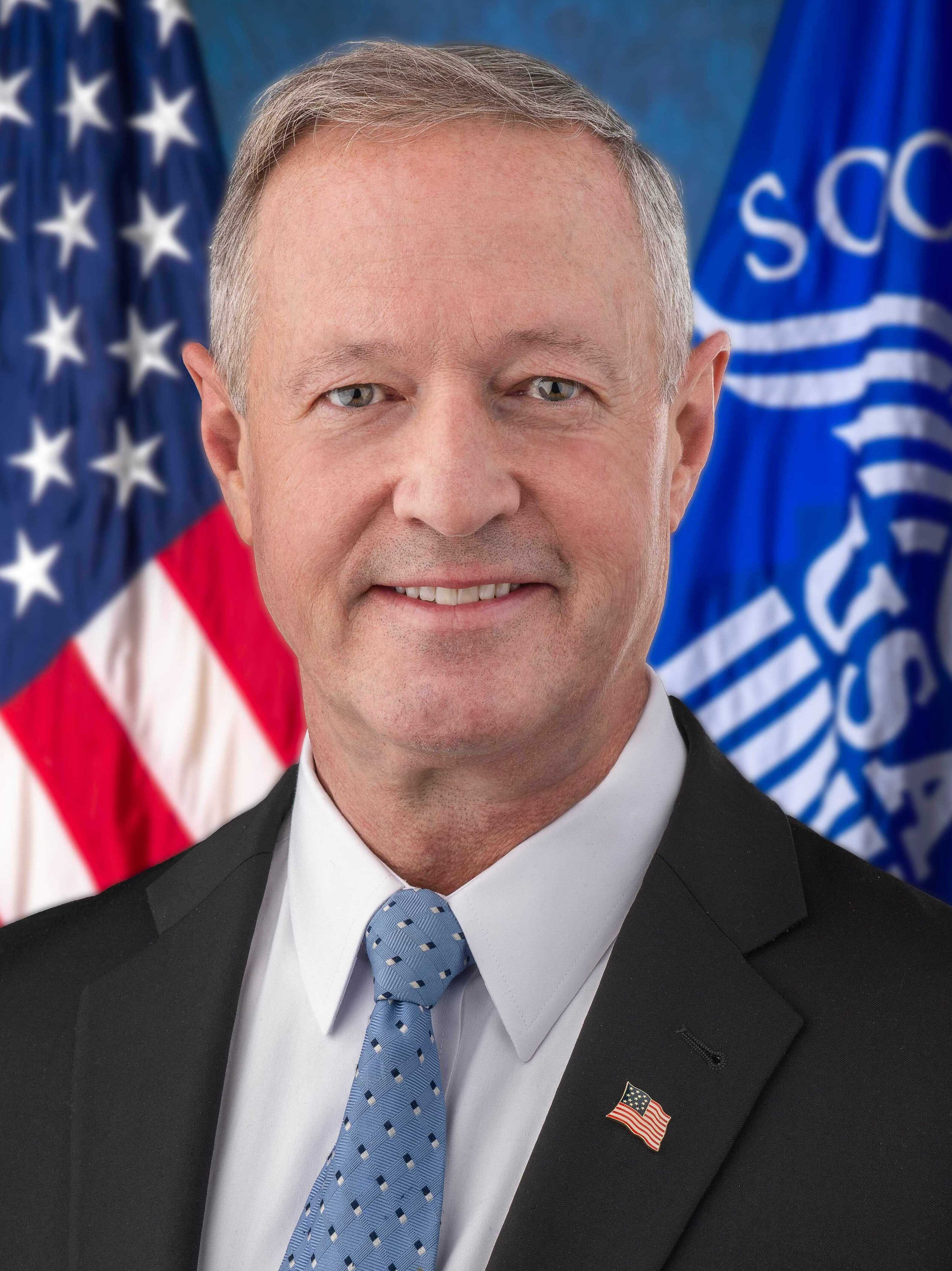
Candidate	Ken Martin	Ben Wikler	Martin O'Malley
Caucus vote	246.5	134.5	44
Percentage	55.02%	30.02%	10.28%
Chair before election
Jaime Harrison
Elected Chair
Ken Martin

The 2025 Democratic National Committee chairmanship election was held on February 1, 2025, at the party's winter meeting in National Harbor, Maryland, to determine the next chairperson of the Democratic National Committee (DNC). Jaime Harrison did not seek a second term as chair of the party. Ken Martin won the election on the first ballot with 246.5 votes.

== Background ==
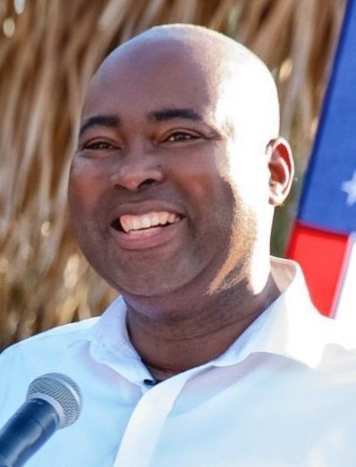
Jaime Harrison, the outgoing DNC chair

Harrison was elected chair of the Democratic National Committee in January 2021, following the presidential election of Joe Biden in 2020. During his tenure, Harrison defended Biden from calls to suspend his 2024 re-election campaign amid the first 2024 presidential debate. Following the 2024 United States presidential election, in which Democratic vice president Kamala Harris was defeated by Republican former president Donald Trump, it was reported that Harrison would not seek re-election as chair of the Democratic National Committee in 2025. An all-staff meeting was held on November 6, 2024, to discuss the results of the election and a potential timeline for a leadership vote, which was initially scheduled to occur by March 1, 2025 at the latest, according to party bylaws.

Harrison officially announced that he would not seek re-election as DNC chair on November 25, 2024. The election to determine the next chair was held during the party's winter meeting on February 1, 2025, during which 448 DNC members voted on a chair; a simple majority of votes was required to win.

== Timeline ==
- November 6, 2024 – Reuters reports that Jaime Harrison will not seek re-election as chair of the Democratic National Committee in 2025 following the party's defeat in the 2024 United States presidential election.
- December 12, 2024 – Meeting of the Democratic National Committee's Rules and Bylaws Committee voted on the chair election process.
- January 2025 – Four candidate forums featuring qualifying candidates were held.
- February 1, 2025 – Election was held by party voting members at the DNC's Winter Meeting, and Ken Martin was elected.

== Candidates ==
In order to qualify as a candidate for chair, prospective candidates had to submit a nominating statement signed by 40 DNC members by January 25, 2025.

=== Declared ===
- Quintessa Hathaway, educator and nominee for Arkansas's 2nd congressional district in 2022
- Ken Martin, vice chair of the Democratic National Committee (2017–2025) and chair of the Minnesota Democratic–Farmer–Labor Party (2011–2025)
- Martin O'Malley, commissioner of the Social Security Administration (2023–2024), former governor of Maryland (2007–2015), and candidate for president in 2016
- Jason Paul, executive member of the Newton, Massachusetts Democratic City Committee (2016–present)
- Faiz Shakir, campaign manager for Bernie Sanders's 2020 presidential campaign
- Ben Wikler, chair of the Wisconsin Democratic Party (2019–2025)
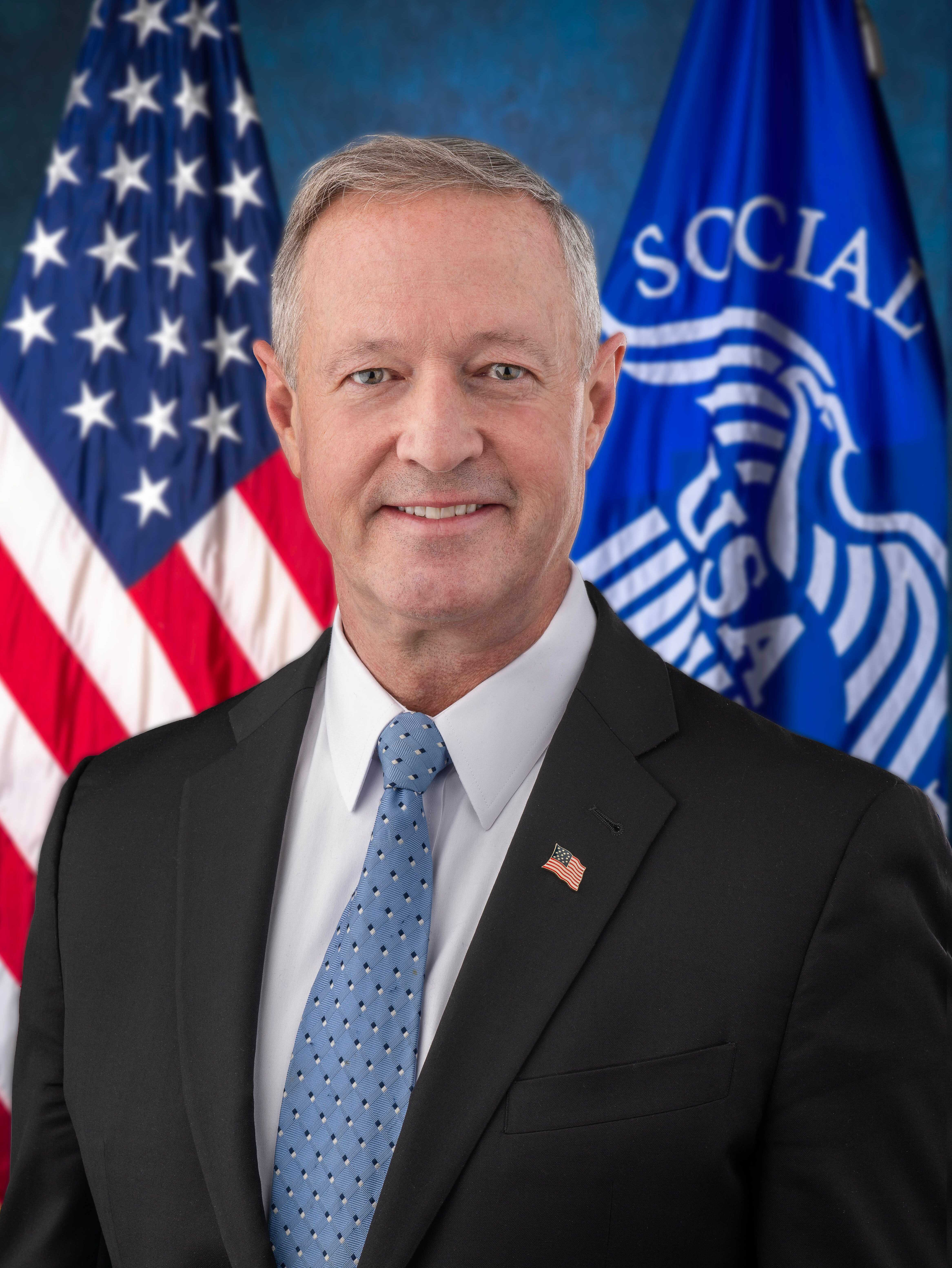
Social Security Administration commissioner
Martin O'Malley
(2023–2024)

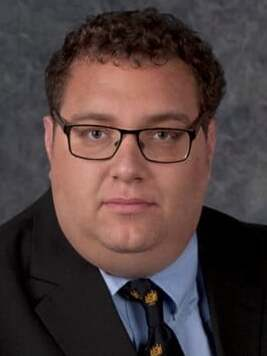
Attorney
Jason Paul

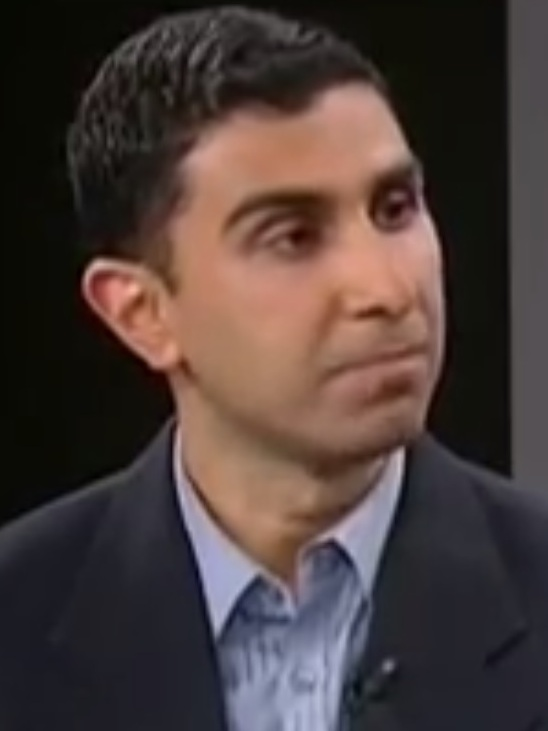
Political advisor
Faiz Shakir

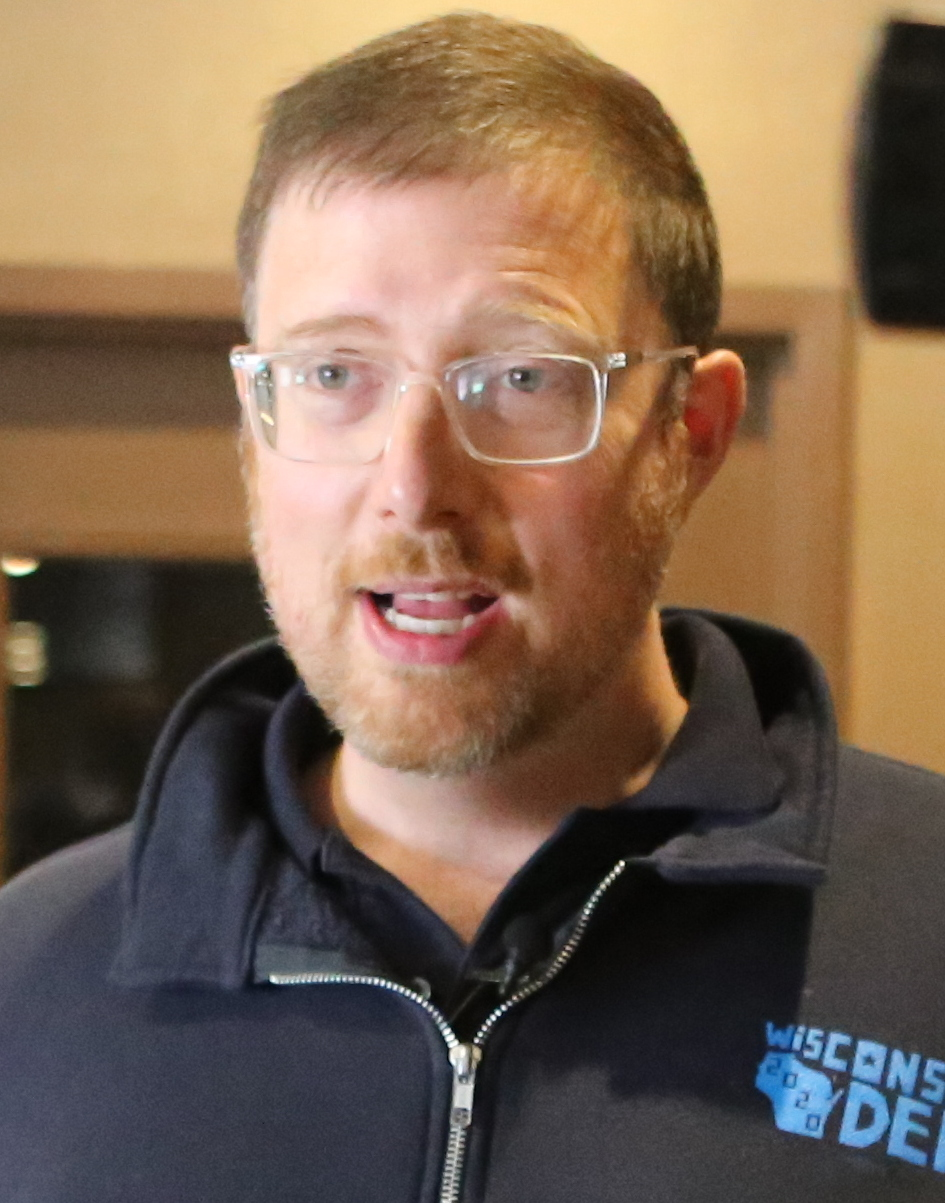
Wisconsin Democratic
Party chair
Ben Wikler
(2019–2025)

=== Disqualified ===
- Robert Houton, nonprofit executive and candidate in the 2024 United States Senate election in Maryland

=== Withdrawn ===
- James Skoufis, member of the New York State Senate (2019–present) and former member of the New York State Assembly (2013–2018) (endorsed Martin)
- Nate Snyder, former United States Department of Homeland Security official (endorsed Martin)
- Marianne Williamson, author and candidate for president in 2020 and 2024 (endorsed Martin)

=== Declined ===
- Stacey Abrams, former minority leader of the Georgia House of Representatives (2011–2017) from the 84th district (2007–2013) and 89th district (2013–2017) and candidate for governor of Georgia in 2018 and 2022 (endorsed Wikler)
- Andy Beshear, governor of Kentucky (2019–present) (endorsed Wikler)
- Michael Blake, former vice chair of the Democratic National Committee (2017–2021) (running for mayor of New York City and ran for DNC vice chair of civic engagement)
- Sherrod Brown, U.S. senator from Ohio (2007–2025)
- Laphonza Butler, U.S. senator from California (2023–2024) and former president of EMILY's List (2021–2023)
- Pete Buttigieg, U.S. Secretary of Transportation (2021–2025), former mayor of South Bend (2012–2020), and candidate for DNC chair in 2017 and president in 2020
- Rahm Emanuel, U.S. Ambassador to Japan (2022–2025) and former mayor of Chicago (2011–2019)
- Marcia Fudge, former U.S. Secretary of Housing and Urban Development (2021–2024) and U.S. Representative from Ohio's 11th congressional district (2008–2021) (endorsed O'Malley)
- Mitch Landrieu, senior advisor to the president for Infrastructure Investment and Jobs (2021–2024) and former mayor of New Orleans (2010–2018) (endorsed O'Malley)
- Mallory McMorrow, majority whip of the Michigan Senate (2023–present) from the 8th district (2019–present) (endorsed Wikler)
- Phil Murphy, governor of New Jersey (2018–2026)
- Dean Phillips, former U.S. Representative from Minnesota's 3rd congressional district (2019–2025) and candidate for president in 2024 (endorsed Martin)
- Chuck Rocha, political strategist

== Forums and debates ==
The party hosted forums for candidates, who will need to submit the signatures of 40 DNC members to participate in forums. Each of the forums were livestreamed. All declared candidates qualified to attend the forums, however, Robert Houton was barred from attending any forums by outgoing DNC chair Jaime Harrison after making several positive statements about President Donald Trump and several contributions to Republican candidates.

Debates among candidates for the 2025 Democratic National Committee chairmanship election
No.	Date and time	Place	Host	Link	Participants								
P Present I Invited A Absent N Not invited NYD Not yet declared candidacy W Withdrawn					Hathaway	Martin	O'Malley	Paul	Shakir	Skoufis	Snyder	Wikler	Williamson
1	December 7, 2024; 4:45 p.m. ET	Boston, MA	Young Democrats of America	YouTube	N	P	P	N	NYD	P	N	P	NYD
2	January 6, 2025; 6:00 p.m. ET	Virtual	DNC Labor Council	YouTube	P	P	P	P	NYD	P	P	P	P
3	January 11, 2025; 4:00 p.m. ET	Virtual	Democratic National Committee	YouTube	P	P	P	P	NYD	P	P	P	P
4	January 14, 2025; 8:00 p.m. ET	Virtual	Brian Tyler Cohen; Leigh McGowan	YouTube	P	P	P	P	NYD	P	A	P	P
5	January 16, 2025; 7:30 p.m. ET	Detroit, MI	Democratic National Committee; Politico	YouTube	P	P	P	P	N	W	P	P	P
6	January 23, 2025; 2:00 p.m. ET	Virtual	Democratic National Committee	YouTube	P	P	P	P	N	W	P	P	P
7	January 24, 2025; 6:00 p.m. ET	Charleston, SC	Democratic National Committee; South Carolina Democratic Party	YouTube	P	P	P	P	A	W	P	P	A
8	January 30, 2025; 3:00 p.m. ET	Washington, D.C.	Democratic National Committee; MSNBC	YouTube	P	P	P	P	P	W	P	P	P

== Endorsements ==
Ken Martin

Executive Branch officials

- Deb Haaland, former U.S. Secretary of Interior (2021–2025)

U.S. senators

- Heidi Heitkamp, North Dakota (2013–2019)
- Amy Klobuchar, Minnesota (2007–present)
- Tina Smith, Minnesota (2018–present)

U.S. representatives

- Joyce Beatty, OH-03 (2013–present)
- Jim Clyburn, SC-06 (1993–present)
- Angie Craig, MN-02 (2019–present)
- Robert Garcia, CA-42 (2023–present)
- Betty McCollum, MN-04 (2001–present)
- Ilhan Omar, MN-05 (2019–present)
- Dean Phillips, MN-03 (2019–2025) and candidate for president in 2024
- Nikema Williams, GA-05 (2021–present) and chair of the Georgia Democratic Party (2013, 2019–present)

Statewide officials

- Keith Ellison, attorney general of Minnesota (2019–present) and candidate for DNC chair in 2017
- Peggy Flanagan, Lieutenant Governor of Minnesota (2019–present)
- Terry McAuliffe, former Governor of Virginia (2014–2018) and chair of the Democratic National Committee (2001–2005)
- Tim Walz, Governor of Minnesota (2019–present) and nominee for vice president in 2024

State legislators

- James Skoufis, member of the New York State Senate (2019–present)

Individuals

- Stuart Appelbaum, president of the Retail, Wholesale and Department Store Union (1998–present)
- Marc Perrone, president of the United Food and Commercial Workers (2014–present)
- Marianne Williamson, author and candidate for president in 2020 and 2024

Party officials

- 200 DNC members, including:
- 51 state party chairs and vice chairs
- James Zogby, president of the Arab American Institute, DNC Ethnic Council chair, and former DNC Executive Committee member (2001–2017)

Organizations

- Latino Victory Fund
- Minnesota Young DFL
Martin O'Malley

Executive Branch officials

- Marcia Fudge, former U.S. Secretary of Housing and Urban Development (2021–2024)

U.S. senators

- Angela Alsobrooks, Maryland (2025–present)
- Ben Cardin, Maryland (2007–2025)
- Tim Kaine, Virginia (2013–present), former chair of the Democratic National Committee (2009–2011), and nominee for vice president in 2016
- Chris Van Hollen, Maryland (2017–present)

U.S. representatives

- Emanuel Cleaver, MO-05 (2005–present)
- Kweisi Mfume, MD-07 (1987–1996, 2020–present)
- Jamie Raskin, MD-08 (2017–present)
- Bennie Thompson, MS-02 (1993–present)

Mayors

- 50 current and former mayors, including:
- Manny Diaz, former chair of the Florida Democratic Party (2021–2023) and mayor of Miami (2001–2009)
- Shirley Franklin, former mayor of Atlanta (2002–2010)
- Mitch Landrieu, senior advisor to the president for Infrastructure Investment and Jobs (2021–2024) and former mayor of New Orleans (2010–2018)
- Levar Stoney, former mayor of Richmond (2017–2025)
- Jack Young, former mayor of Baltimore (2019–2020)

Party officials

- 137 DNC members

Labor unions

- International Federation of Professional and Technical Engineers
Faiz Shakir

Individuals

- Sara Nelson, president of the Association of Flight Attendants
Ben Wikler

Executive Branch officials

- Robert Reich, former U.S. Secretary of Labor (1993–1997)
- Julie Su, former acting U.S. Secretary of Labor (2023–2025)

U.S. senators

- Tammy Baldwin, Wisconsin (2013–present)
- Dick Durbin, Senate Minority Whip (2005–2007, 2015–2021, 2025–present) from Illinois (1997–present)
- Chris Murphy, Connecticut, (2013–present)
- Brian Schatz, Hawaii (2012–present)
- Chuck Schumer, Senate Minority Leader (2017–2021, 2025–present) from New York (1999–present)

U.S. representatives

- Pramila Jayapal, WA-07 (2017–present)
- Hakeem Jeffries, House Minority Leader (2023–present) from NY-08 (2013–present)
- Marcy Kaptur, OH-09 (1983–present)
- Gwen Moore, WI-04 (2005–present)
- Nancy Pelosi, former Speaker of the U.S. House of Representatives (2007–2011, 2019–2023) from CA-11 (1987–present)
- Mark Pocan, WI-02 (2013–present)
- Delia Ramirez, IL-03 (2023–present)
- Tim Ryan, OH-13 (2003–2023)
- Jan Schakowsky, IL-09 (1999–present)

Statewide officials

- Jocelyn Benson, Michigan Secretary of State (2019–present)
- Andy Beshear, Governor of Kentucky (2019–present)
- Tony Evers, Governor of Wisconsin (2019–present)
- Garlin Gilchrist, Lieutenant Governor of Michigan (2019–present)
- Maura Healey, Governor of Massachusetts (2023–present)
- Kathy Hochul, Governor of New York (2021–present)
- Daniel Hynes, former Illinois Comptroller (1999–2011)
- Laura Kelly, Governor of Kansas (2019–present)
- Tina Kotek, Governor of Oregon (2023–present)
- Michelle Lujan Grisham, Governor of New Mexico (2019–present)
- Janet Mills, Governor of Maine (2019–present)
- Gretchen Whitmer, Governor of Michigan (2019–present)

State legislators

- Stacey Abrams, former minority leader of the Georgia House of Representatives (2011–2017) from the 84th district (2007–2013) and 89th district (2013–2017) and nominee for governor of Georgia in 2018 and 2022
- Mallory McMorrow, majority whip of the Michigan Senate (2023–present) from the 8th district (2019–present)
- Greta Neubauer, minority leader of the Wisconsin State Assembly (2022–present) from the 66th district (2018–present)

Mayors

- Ras Baraka, mayor of Newark (2014–present)

Individuals

- Daniella Ballou-Aares, CEO of Leadership Now Project
- Jonathan Cowan, president and co-founder of Third Way
- Jon Favreau, co-host of Pod Save America
- Michelle Goldberg, columnist
- Leah Greenberg, executive director of Indivisible
- John Nichols, author, associate editor of The Cap Times, and national affairs correspondent for The Nation magazine
- Christine Pelosi, political strategist and daughter of Nancy Pelosi
- Becky Pringle, president of the National Education Association (2020–present)
- Jennifer Rubin, columnist
- Lee Saunders, president of the American Federation of State, County and Municipal Employees (2012–present)
- April Verrett, president of the Service Employees International Union (2024–present)
- Randi Weingarten, president of the American Federation of Teachers (2008–present)

Party officials

- 183 DNC members
- Lavora Barnes, chair of the Michigan Democratic Party (2019–present)
- Anderson Clayton, chair of the North Carolina Democratic Party (2023–present)
- Mike Tate, former chair of the Wisconsin Democratic Party (2009–2015)
- Jason Morgan, first vice chair of the Michigan Democratic Party (2023–present) and member of the Michigan House of Representatives from the 23rd district (2023–present)

Organizations

- Indivisible
- Leadership Now Project
- MoveOn
- Progressive Change Campaign Committee
- Third Way

Labor unions

- American Federation of State, County and Municipal Employees
- American Federation of Teachers
- International Union of Bricklayers and Allied Craftworkers
- National Education Association
- Service Employees International Union
- UNITE HERE

Newspapers

- The Cap Times
Declined to endorse

Executive Branch officials

- Kamala Harris, 49th vice president of the United States (2021–2025) and nominee for president in 2024

U.S. senators

- Andy Kim, New Jersey (2024–present)

Statewide officials

- Phil Murphy, Governor of New Jersey (2018–2026)
- ~~Tim Walz, Governor of Minnesota (2019–present) and nominee for vice president in 2024~~ (endorsed Martin)

Organizations

- Association of State Democratic Committees

Labor unions

- AFL-CIO

Party officials

- Jaime Harrison, chair of the Democratic National Committee (2021–2025)
Jonathan Jackson (undeclared)

U.S. representatives

- Ro Khanna, CA-17 (2017–present)
James Skoufis (withdrawn)

Party officials

- 23 DNC members
Rahm Emanuel (declined to run)

U.S. representatives

- Steve Israel, NY-03 (2001–2017)

Party officials

- David Axelrod, political consultant

== Results ==
Of the 428 votes cast, Martin won 246.5 votes, Wikler won 134.5 votes, O'Malley won 44 votes, Shakir won two votes and Paul received one.

Candidate	Round 1
Ken Martin	246.5
Ben Wikler	134.5
Martin O'Malley	44
Faiz Shakir	2
Jason Paul	1
Quintessa Hathaway	0
No vote	
Abstain	4
Total	

Candidate secured enough votes to win election
Candidate secured a plurality of votes in the round
Candidate withdrew

== Structural reform proposals ==
As in 2021, rank-and-file DNC members sought a series of reforms to make the DNC more democratic and transparent.

Publicizing delegate names and votes: The DNC has never officially published its delegate roster. Tom Perkins of The American Prospect called the roster a "black box" and published an independently compiled list of DNC members, drawn from candidates' whip operations and other public records. Other pro-reform DNC members support publishing how individual DNC members have voted on each DNC election and resolution.

Reducing the number and power of chair-appointed delegates: The sitting DNC chairperson can appoint up to 75 DNC delegates (about 16% of the maximum 448 voting delegates, or 19% of the typical ~400), while most of the rest are elected by primary voters (200) and state parties (114). Pro-reform DNC members pushed for the chair to appoint fewer delegates and to give appointed delegates less power. In particular, pro-reform DNC members wanted to reduce appointed delegate power on the three powerful standing committees (Credentials; Resolutions; and Rules and Bylaws), whose members had historically been mostly appointed by the sitting chair. Candidate Ken Martin supported this reform in his campaign. In June 2025, Martin reduced the number of appointed delegates on the standing committees, and increased their total number of seats, resulting in "24 out of roughly 135 seats" (about 18%) being appointed, roughly half of the historical rate.

On August 26, 2025, Martin brought eight rule amendments before the DNC's Rules and Bylaws Committee, all of which were approved. The amendments reduced the number of chair-appointed members from 75 to 60 seats; reallocated those 15 seats to the party's Asian American and Pacific Islander, Black, Hispanic, LGBTQ, and Native American caucuses; expanded the oversight authority of the budget committee; capped the number of chair-appointed members on major committees. Pro-reform DNC member David McDonald called the package a "major democratization of the Democratic National Committee", and pro-reform DNC member David Atkins called it a successful "small-d democratic regrowth".

Martin's reform package also requires DNC staff and officers to remain neutral in Democratic primary contests.
