= Bernie Sanders presidential campaign =

Bernie Sanders presidential campaign may refer to:

- Bernie Sanders 2016 presidential campaign
- Bernie Sanders 2020 presidential campaign
