= ThinkProgress =

American progressive news website

- Website type: News and political blogs
- Available in: English
- Founded: 2005
- Dissolved: 2019
- Owner: Center for American Progress Action Fund
- Editors: Judd Legum, Faiz Shakir
- Website: thinkprogress.org
- Current status: Defunct

ThinkProgress was an American progressive news website that was active from 2005 to 2019. It was a project of the Center for American Progress Action Fund (CAP Action), a progressive public policy research and advocacy organization. Founded by Judd Legum in 2005, the site's reports were regularly discussed by mainstream news outlets and peer-reviewed academic journals. ThinkProgress also hosted a climate section called Climate Progress, which was founded by Joe Romm.

In 2019, after financial losses, CAP Action unsuccessfully sought a new publisher for the site. No new content has been added since September 2019, rendering ThinkProgress effectively defunct.

== History ==
ThinkProgress was founded in 2005 by Judd Legum, a lawyer, who ran the site until he left in 2007. Faiz Shakir edited the site from 2007 until 2012, when Legum returned as editor-in-chief. Legum left the site again in 2018. ThinkProgress described itself as "editorially independent" of the Center for American Progress (CAP) and CAP Action. In its early years, ThinkProgress included a daily newsletter that contained a recap and analysis of major political news and the blog Wonk Room, which was published until 2011. In that year, the site was redesigned to offer sections organized by subject matter, and other CAP Action blogs were consolidated into the site. The site was then divided into sections covering climate, economy, health, justice, LGBT, world, culture, sports, politics and features. In 2017, the site's organization returned to a less segmented presentation.

ThinkProgress had a staff of five in 2006 and 42 in 2017. In 2015, the staff of ThinkProgress unionized with the Writers Guild of America, East. Previous staffers who went on to write for other media outlets include Alyssa Rosenberg and Andrea Peterson, who joined The Washington Post; Matthew Yglesias, who moved to Slate and Vox; Zaid Jilani, who writes for The Intercept; and Nico Pitney and Amanda Terkel, who joined The Huffington Post. Shakir, who led the 2020 presidential campaign of Bernie Sanders, later headed (together with Pitney) More Perfect Union, a labor-focused news outlet that he described as "ThinkProgress for a digital age."

ThinkProgress's climate section, Climate Progress, was founded by climate scientist Joseph J. Romm. The section discussed climate and energy, political news related to climate change, and responses to climate change by the media. In November 2016 ThinkProgress launched a "Trump Investigation Fund" crowdfunding effort. In 2017, Michael Goldfarb, founder of the conservative newspaper The Washington Free Beacon and its parent company, the Center for American Freedom, said he modeled them on ThinkProgress and CAP.

=== Closure ===
In mid-2019, after the site had experienced declining revenue, traffic and donations, CAP put ThinkProgress up for sale. No buyer was found. A plan to make ThinkProgress the institutional blog of the Center for American Progress was abandoned, and publication on the site ended on September 5, 2019.

== Reporting ==
=== Impact on mainstream press ===
ThinkProgress reports drew comment from news outlets such as The New York Times, The Guardian, The Washington Post, The Wall Street Journal, Time magazine and CNN. (Note: Cited to multiple sources: The New York Times, The Guardian, Washington Post, Wall Street Journal, Time and CNN.) For example, Times reporter Ian Urbina, in his coverage of hostility in the health care reform debate, cited a 2009 ThinkProgress report by Lee Fang on a Tea Party Patriots strategy memo advocating disrupting town hall meetings of Democratic members of Congress.

After the Upper Big Branch Mine disaster in 2010, ThinkProgress reported on the safety record of mine owner Massey Energy, finding over $2.2 million in fines levied by the Mine Safety and Health Administration against Massey for more than 3,000 safety violations; Times reporter Tom Zeller Jr. cited the figures in the Times's coverage of Massey's safety record. In 2013, ThinkProgress posted a video of Pam Simon, a staffer for Representative Gabby Giffords, who was shot alongside Giffords in 2011, confronting Senator Kelly Ayotte regarding Ayotte's opposition to closing the gun show loophole; the Times cited the video in a report on gun control activism among gun violence victims. In a 2015 op-ed in the Times, Charles M. Blow excerpted ThinkProgress research on gender in chief executive officer hiring. The same year, Blow excerpted ThinkProgress research on the effectiveness of drug screening of Temporary Assistance for Needy Families recipients in an analysis of the political rhetoric of poverty.

In 2006, The Guardian highlighted a series of reports in ThinkProgress that exposed inaccuracies in the ABC television mini-series The Path to 9/11. The network re-edited several disputed scenes. In 2011 a report in The Guardian by Ewen MacAskill, Julian Borger, Jon Boone and Nicholas Watt on U.S. policy toward Afghanistan excerpted a ThinkProgress interview with Senator Barney Frank. In 2016 a Guardian investigation by Jonathan Freedland of the basis of Donald Trump's claims of voter fraud in the Iowa Caucuses excerpted a ThinkProgress report that a two-year investigation by the Iowa Secretary of State found no voter impersonation.

Similarly, a 2012 Washington Post article cited ThinkProgress research showing that Crossroads GPS failed to register as a nonprofit organization in Virginia. ThinkProgress reported an average of one school shooting every other day in the first days of 2014; Post columnist Dana Milbank cited the research in a 2014 column on the lack of progress on gun control. In 2017 Fareed Zakaria, in a Post opinion piece, cited a ThinkProgress compilation of policies that candidate Trump pledged to implement on his first day as President. In 2017 Wall Street Journal columnist William Galston cited a ThinkProgress report of 52% unemployment among 16- to 64-year-olds in the Sandtown-Winchester neighborhood of Baltimore, twice the unemployment rate of the city as a whole. In 2014, Time magazine, CNN and NPR picked up ThinkProgress reports on Chipotle Mexican Grill's including in their annual report a warning to investors regarding the risk of climate change on operations.

=== Research and academia ===
In 2017 ThinkProgress published the disciplinary records of the New York City police officer who put Eric Garner in a fatal choke hold. ThinkProgress also tracked anti-Muslim and antisemitic incidents.

=== Climate Progress ===
After his 2011 Climate Progress report identifying food insecurity as "the biggest impact that climate change is likely to have on most people for most of this century", the journal Nature invited Romm to write a commentary on desertification. In a 2016 article in The New York Times, Andrew Revkin recommended Romm's assessment in Climate Progress of the prospects for the climate and the environment under newly elected President Trump. Andrew Leonard in Salon, John Rennie of the Public Library of Science and Jim Naureckas of Fairness and Accuracy in Reporting cited a 2010 Climate Progress report in their critiques of an online poll regarding attitudes toward climate change conducted by Scientific American magazine.

== Reception ==
ThinkProgress had about 100,000 visitors per day in 2006, 6 million unique visitors and 14 million page views in March 2014, and 8 to 10 million unique page views per month in 2017. In 2017, Lifewire ranked ThinkProgress among the ten most popular news blogs on the Internet. According to CAP, the site received "more than 12 million pageviews and 7.5 million unique visitors in June 2019".

In 2008, Time magazine named Climate Progress one of the "Top 15 Green Websites," saying that Climate Progress "counters bad science and inane rhetoric with original analysis." In 2009, Thomas Friedman, in his column in The New York Times, called Climate Progress "indispensable." In 2010 Time included Climate Progress in a list of the 25 "Best Blogs of 2010", saying Climate Progress was one of "the blogs we can't live without." In 2010, UK's The Guardian included Climate Progress on its list of "Top 50 Twitter climate accounts to follow", saying Climate Progress was one of "the key people and organisations you should be following on Twitter if you're interested in climate change." In 2015 Tim Ward wrote in HuffPost that Climate Progress "has been the best available source of climate-change news for several years."

=== Criticism ===
In 2010, Lee Fang wrote in ThinkProgress that the United States Chamber of Commerce funded political advertising campaigns from its general fund, which solicits funds from foreign sources. FactCheck.org said that the claim that "foreign corporations are 'stealing our democracy' with secret, illegal contributions funneled through the U.S. Chamber of Commerce" had "little basis in fact. ... At least 84 foreign companies pay at least $885,000 in dues to the [Chamber of Commerce], according to ThinkProgress. Still lacking, though, is any proof that the money is being used in the chamber’s ad campaign." Eric Lichtblau of The New York Times said that the article "provided no evidence that the money generated overseas had been used in United States campaigns."

In 2015, Glenn Greenwald wrote in The Intercept that CAP officials pressured ThinkProgress staff into placating the Israeli government and the American Israel Public Affairs Committee (AIPAC) in their Middle East reporting, while noting that CAP had cited strategic interests for its stance: "The clear and overwhelming record of the literally hundreds of articles and policy papers from the Center for American Progress and ThinkProgress demonstrates our longstanding support both for Israel and the two-state solution to the Middle East peace process as being in the moral and national security interests of the United States."
