= Media coverage of Bernie Sanders =

Media coverage of American politician

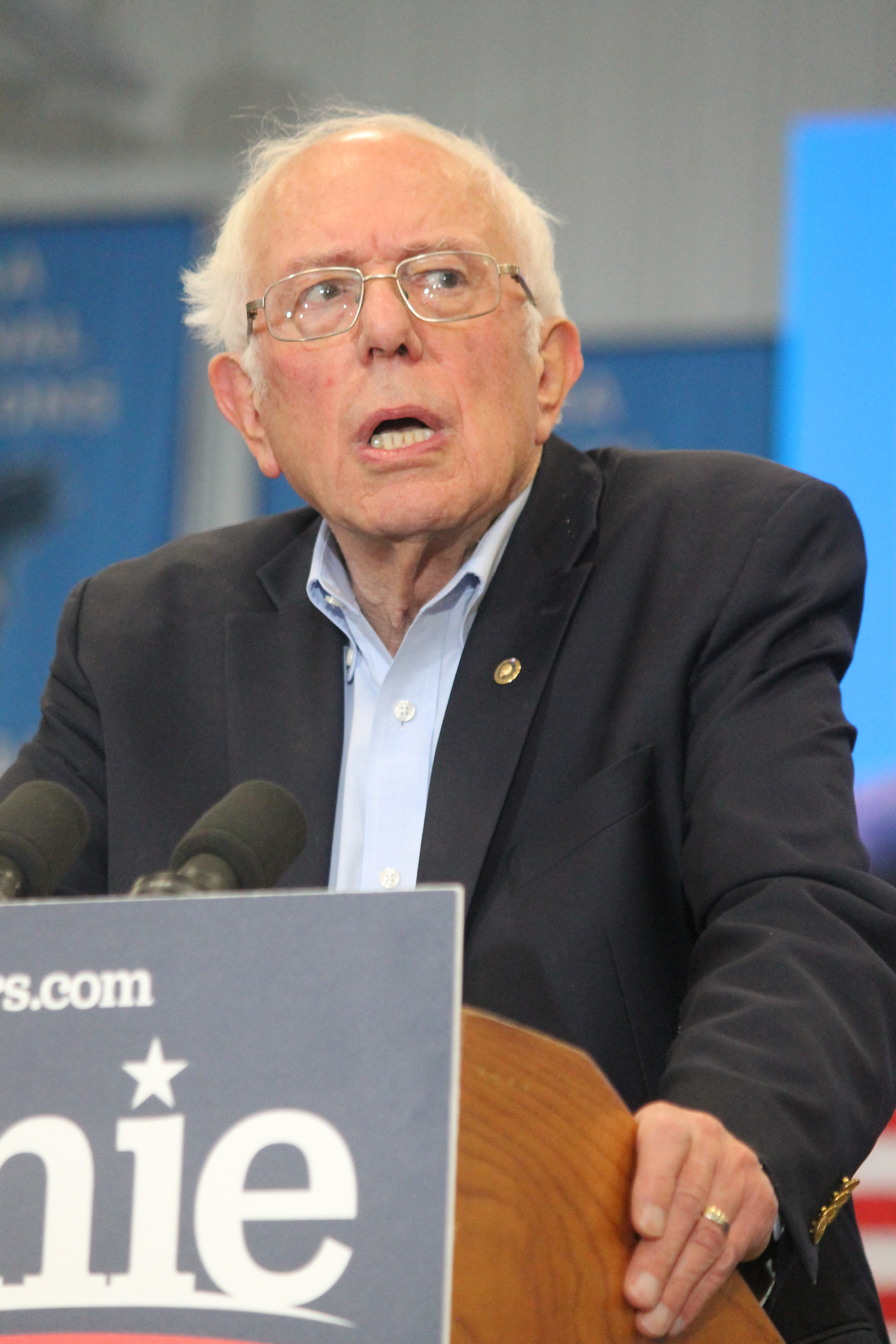
Bernie Sanders in November 2019

The media coverage of Bernie Sanders, a U.S. Senator from Vermont, became a subject of discussion during his unsuccessful 2016 and 2020 presidential runs. His campaigns, independent observers, as well as media sources have said that the mainstream media in the United States is biased against Sanders. Others, particularly those within the mainstream media, say that coverage is unbiased or biased in his favor. The allegations of bias primarily concern the coverage of his presidential campaigns.

A study of the 2016 election found that the amount of media coverage of Sanders during 2015 exceeded his standing in the polls; it was however strongly correlated with his polling performance over the course of the whole campaign. On average, research shows that Sanders received substantially less media coverage than Democratic front-runner Hillary Clinton, but that the tone of his coverage was more favorable than that of any other candidate. During the 2016 election, the media provided substantially more coverage of the Republican primary than the Democratic primary, as Republican candidate Donald Trump dominated media coverage.

During the 2020 Democratic primary, Sanders, his campaign and his supporters again criticized the media for being biased. Sanders suggested that The Washington Post gave him unfair coverage because Sanders had encouraged taxing The Washington Post's owner Jeff Bezos's main company, Amazon, more heavily. The executive editor of the Washington Post rejected Sanders's suggestion, describing it as a "conspiracy theory" and stating that Bezos "allows our newsroom to operate with full independence." In the following election in 2024, Bezos did reportedly intervene by preventing the Post's Editorial Board from publishing a drafted endorsement of the then-Democratic Party nominee Kamala Harris.

== Background ==
Writing in 2005, Sanders identified corporate media coverage of political issues as a subject on which he felt he needed to take a position.

Despite a strong performance in some states, Sanders failed the 2016 Democratic Party presidential primary with his opponent Clinton winning the nomination by June 2016. After the election, he released a campaign book which devoted a chapter to media issues. He wrote that while national media did not cover his visits to poverty-stricken areas of the country, local media did. He also raised issue with the consequences of corporations like General Electric, Comcast, and Disney owning media conglomerates for media coverage of issues like taxation and trans-national trade agreements.

== Academic analyses ==
A 2018 book by political scientists John M. Sides, Michael Tesler and Lynn Vavreck found that the amount of news coverage Sanders received exceeded his share in the national polls in 2015. Throughout the campaign as a whole, their analysis showed that his "media coverage and polling numbers were strongly correlated." They write that "Sanders's appeal, like Trump's, depended on extensive and often positive media coverage." Furthermore, "media coverage brought Sanders to a wider audience and helped spur his long climb in the polls by conveying the familiar tale of the surprisingly successful underdog. Meanwhile, Clinton received more negative media coverage."

Thomas Patterson of the Harvard Kennedy School Shorenstein Center on Media, Politics, and Public Policy wrote a report in June 2016 analyzing the media coverage of candidates in the 2016 presidential primaries. During 2015, the Democratic race received less than half as much news coverage as the Republican race did. The Sanders campaign was "largely ignored in the early months" and "until the pre-primary debates", but that once he did begin to get coverage in 2015, it was "overwhelmingly positive in tone". However, the study contended that the increase in coverage did not happen "at a rate close to what he needed to compensate for the early part of the year."

In her 2018 book The Unprecedented 2016 Presidential Election, Rachel Bitecofer wrote that the Democratic primary was effectively over in terms of delegate count by mid-March 2016, but that the media promoted the narrative that the contest between Sanders and Clinton was "heating up" at that time. Bitecofer found that Trump received more media coverage than Ted Cruz, John Kasich, Hillary Clinton and Bernie Sanders combined during a time when those were the only primary candidates left in the race.

In her book A Rhetoric of Divisive Partisanship: The 2016 American Presidential Campaign Discourse of Bernie Sanders and Donald Trump, Colleen Elizabeth Kelly said that Sanders and Clinton got a share of news coverage that was similar to their eventual primary results, until the stage of the campaign when Clinton pulled ahead in the primary. Sanders received the most favorable coverage of any primary candidate. Kelly writes that Sanders was both right and wrong to complain about media bias, citing the Shorenstein Center report on the media's outsized coverage of the Republican primary, but noting that Sanders' coverage was the most favorable of any candidate.

Early in the primary, John Sides found that the volume of media coverage of Sanders was consistent with his polling and that the press he was getting was more favorable than Clinton's. Jonathan Stray, a computational journalism researcher at the Columbia Journalism School, wrote for Nieman Lab in January 2016 that "at least online" Sanders got coverage proportionate to his standing in polls.

A 2019 study by Northeastern University's School of Journalism found that Sanders initially received the most positive coverage of any major candidate in the 2020 primary and later the third and then fourth most favorable of eight candidates.

== 2016 primary campaign ==
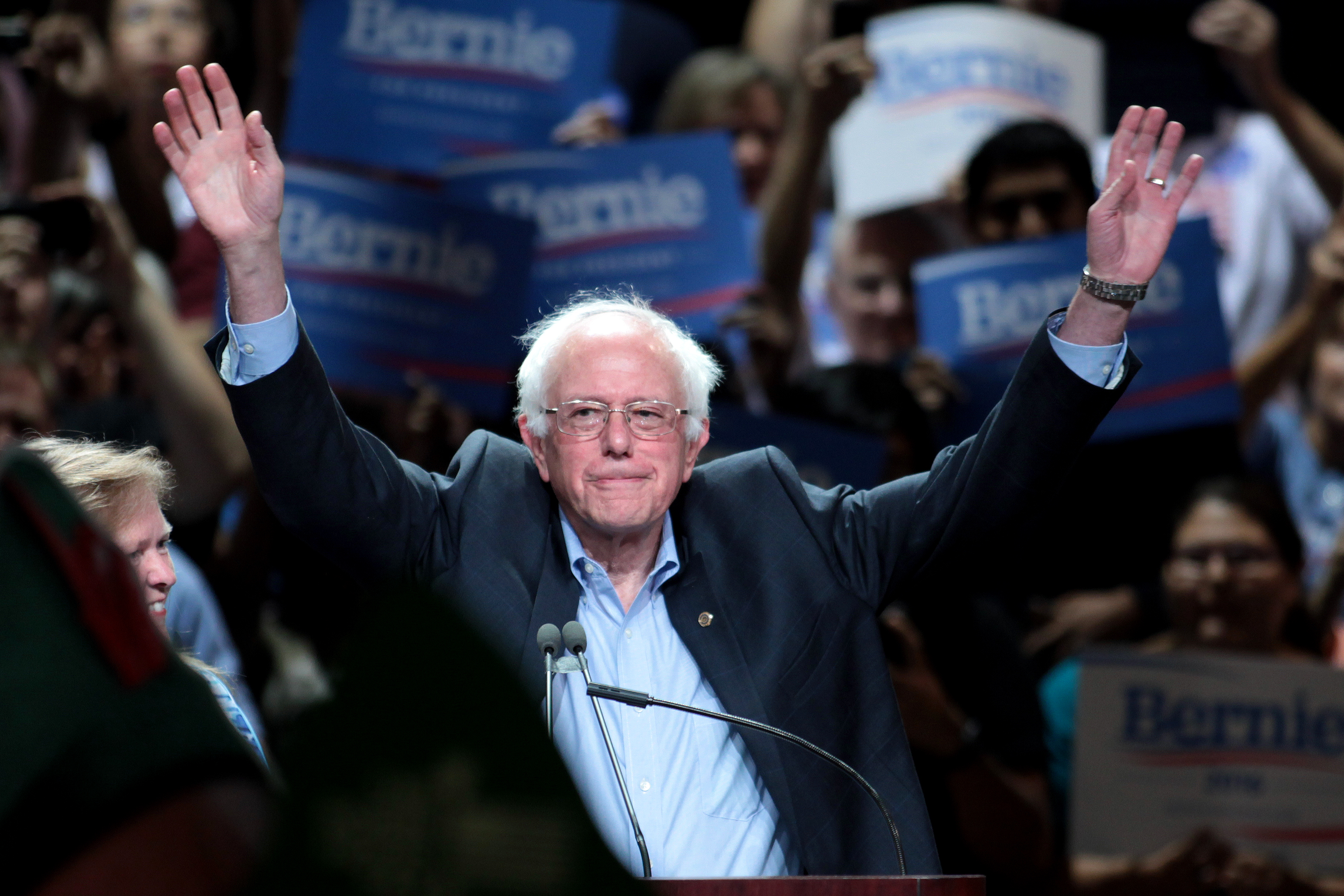
Sanders at a town meeting in Phoenix, Arizona, July 2015

In August 2015, Elizabeth Jensen, the public editor for NPR, responded to an influx of emails to NPR regarding a Morning Edition segment. Jensen said that she does not "find that NPR has been slighting" Sanders' campaign and added, "In the last two days alone, NPR has covered the Democrats' climate change stances and reactions to the Republican debate and Sanders has been well in the mix."

In the following month, Margaret Sullivan, public editor of The New York Times, wrote that she had received many complaints from readers about purported bias against Sanders. She responded that The New York Times had given roughly the same amount of articles dedicated to Sanders as they did to similarly polling Republican candidates (barring Donald Trump), while conceding that some of the articles written were "fluff" and "regrettably dismissive". Later in the month, The Washington Post wrote that "Sanders has not faced the kind of media scrutiny, let alone attacks from opponents, that leading candidates eventually experience."

In January 2016, Claire Malone from FiveThirtyEight rejected notions that Sanders was the subject of a "media blackout", saying he received 30 percent of coverage in the Democratic primary at that time. That same month, The Guardian reported that Sanders aides had accused David Brock, a Clinton ally, of mudslinging, after Brock spoke to the press about one of Sanders' campaign ads, suggesting that "it seems black lives don't matter to Bernie Sanders." Despite this characterization, the ad "elicited very positive responses when it was shown to a representative sample of Americans." Asked by Jay Newton-Small of Time in February if he was "fighting an asymmetrical war against [Sanders]," Brock commented that "we do opposition research, but we haven't leveled any false accusations against Senator Sanders and we won't."

Fairness & Accuracy in Reporting (FAIR) wrote that between 10:20 p.m. Sunday, March 6, to 3:54 p.m. Monday, March 7, a period of about 16 hours, that The Washington Post ran 16 negative articles on Sanders. Of the 16 articles examined by FAIR, two were opinion articles; one was a story originating from the Associated Press; and 12 were blogs stories in which the writers are required to include "commentary and analysis". FAIR's criteria for identifying an article as negative or positive was viewed as "overly broad" by the Post.

According to researcher Thomas Patterson, the Republican/Democratic primary coverage split from March 15 to May 3 was 64–36 and the Clinton/Sanders media coverage split was 61–39. Patterson ascribes this difference to "the influence of 'electability' on reporting," rather than on polling numbers. This period was the first time in the campaign that Clinton's press was marginally positive, and Sanders's press was slightly negative.

In Rolling Stone, Matt Taibbi criticized The New York Times for retroactively making online changes to a March 15, 2016 article about Sanders's legislative accomplishments over the past 25 years. In addition to rewording the title, several paragraphs were added. In 2019, Margaret Sullivan, public editor at The New York Times, characterized the changes as "stealth editing" and added that "the changes to this story were so substantive that a reader who saw the piece when it first went up might come away with a very different sense of Sanders' legislative accomplishments than one who saw it hours later."

In April 2016, NPR's media correspondent David Folkenflik responded to criticisms of bias against Sanders saying that Sanders had appeared three times on NPR whereas Clinton had only done so once, that media outlets saw a Sanders win as a "long shot" early in the campaign, and that by April 2016, she appeared very likely to win the nomination. The same month, Ezra Klein and Matthew Yglesias of Vox wrote the media was biased in favor of Sanders because Clinton's lead was becoming increasingly insurmountable, yet the media had a vested commercial interest in exaggerating how close the race was.

== 2020 primary campaign ==
=== 2019 ===
According to a March 2019 analysis by Northeastern University's School of Journalism, Sanders received the most positive coverage of any major candidate in the 2020 Democratic primary. An updated analysis in April after more candidates had entered the field placed him third out of eight candidates; a further update for June to September 2019 found that Sanders's positive coverage ranked fourth out of eight major candidates.

In April 2019, Sanders wrote to the board of the Center for American Progress in response to a video produced by their former media outlet ThinkProgress. The video mocked him for becoming a millionaire after writing a book about his 2016 election run. The article based on the video was later emended to remove references about Sanders' physical appearance. The following month, Politico published a feature article on Sanders's income which described him as "rich" and "cheap". Politico was criticized by the Anti-Defamation League.

In August 2019, Sanders said that The Washington Post did not "write particularly good articles" about him and suggested that it was because he frequently mentioned that Amazon, The Washington Post's parent company, did not pay taxes. Marty Baron, executive editor of The Washington Post, responded, "Contrary to the conspiracy theory the senator seems to favor, Jeff Bezos allows our newsroom to operate with full independence, as our reporters and editors can attest."

In November 2019, Emma Specter at Vogue doubted that there was a conspiracy against Sanders. She also listed several examples of limited coverage of his policy proposals and interpreted lack of coverage of Sanders on certain issues and events as being "only somewhat surprising".

In a December 2019 opinion column for The New York Times, David Leonhardt agreed with Politico co-founder John F. Harris about the media having a centrist bias. Leonardt argued that this hurt Sanders and Warren, particularly in questions posed to both about the issue of a wealth tax.

In the same month, In These Times analyzed coverage of the 2020 Democratic Party presidential primary by MSNBC between August and September 2019. They said that "MSNBC talked about Biden twice as often as Warren and three times as often as Sanders", and that Sanders was the candidate spoken of negatively the most frequently of the three."

=== 2020 ===
The CNN-sponsored debate between Democratic candidates on January 14, 2020, was the subject of criticism over perceived bias against Sanders, especially concerning moderator Abby Phillip's handling of a he-said, she-said controversy between Sanders and fellow Senator and candidate Elizabeth Warren. Journalism think-tank Poynter Institute called Phillip's treatment of Sanders "stunning in its ineptness and stunning in its unprofessionalism".

In February 2020 media appearances and interviews, against a backdrop of Sanders' ascendance in the polls, campaign consultant James Carville expressed his displeasure at the prospect of Sanders being nominated, branded Sanders as a "communist", pejoratively labeled Sanders' base of support as a "cult" and warned of the "end of days", if Sanders were to win the Democratic nomination.

MSNBC came under particular scrutiny during the first three primary-season state votes due to historical references made by two of their hosts. Chris Matthews compared Sanders to George McGovern in terms of electability on February 3 and criticized Sanders for adopting the "democratic socialist" label on February 7. In reference to Sanders' praise of aspects of Fidel Castro's Cuba, "I believe if Castro and the Reds had won the Cold War there would have been executions in Central Park, and I might have been one of the ones executed" Matthew had said on air during Hardball. He then questioned what Sanders meant when he used the term 'socialism'. The following week, Chuck Todd criticized the rhetoric of Sanders supporters by quoting a conservative article which compared them to brown shirts in the Nazi regime.

Commenting on the 2020 Nevada Democratic caucuses, Matthews invoked "the fall of France" to the Nazis in 1940 as a metaphor for Sanders' apparent victory in the state. His analogy was criticized by the Sanders campaign and other commentators, who noted that members of Sanders' family had been murdered in the Holocaust. Matthews later issued an on-air apology to Sanders and his supporters.

Sanders suspended his campaign on April 8, 2020. The following month, Vice News released the documentary Bernie Blackout directed by Pat McGee. Although largely focused on interviews with campaign staff, the film also attempted to draw parallels between the media's treatment of Sanders supporters and opponents of the Iraq War.

== See also ==
- Bernie Bro
- Dean scream
- Hostile media effect
- Media bias in the United States
- Media coverage of the 2016 United States presidential election
