= Nico Pitney =

American journalist and media executive (born 1981)

Nico Pitney (born 1981) is an American journalist, editor and media executive who has led left-leaning media outlets including HuffPost and NowThis.

== Biography ==
Pitney was born in Tokyo and attended the University of California, Santa Barbara. Pitney worked as Deputy Research Director at the Center for American Progress, where he helped found, and was Managing Editor of, their blog, ThinkProgress. Pitney joined HuffPost in 2007 and served in a variety of capacities, including Politics Editor and DC Bureau Chief during the 2008 United States presidential election, National Editor, Executive Editor, and Managing Editor.

Pitney gained prominence during the 2009 Iranian election protests, where he liveblogged the protest for HuffPost by aggregating social media posts from Iranians, including videos and tweets. According to Pitney, over 100,000 comments were left on the popular blog. As a result, Pitney was asked by the Obama administration to be prepared to pose a question from an Iranian at a June 23, 2009 press conference at the White House. In a departure from typical press conference protocol, Pitney was called on second and asked Obama under what conditions the United States would accept the election of Mahmoud Ahmadinejad. While Pitney did not know if he would be called on to ask a question, and President Obama did not know what question would be asked, a number of critics, including members of the White House press corps charged that the question was an example of improper collusion between the White House and a journalist. One of the most prominent critics was Dana Milbank of The Washington Post. Pitney and Milbank engaged in a heated and personal debate on the CNN program Reliable Sources about the question, and according to Pitney, Milbank whispered to Pitney during a commercial break "You're such a dick". This incident spawned the Twitter hashtag #Dickwhisperer.

Pitney left HuffPost in 2012 to travel the world and blog about his experience with his wife Karina Newton, former new media director for House Minority Leader Nancy Pelosi. In 2013, Pitney returned to HuffPost as head of product.

In 2017, he joined NowThis where he served as Senior Vice President and News and Politics Director. During his tenure, NowThis became the #1 most engaged news brand worldwide, amassing roughly 2.6 billion views monthly across social media platforms, according to Tubular Labs. According to The New Yorker, Pitney led the newsroom and also hosted videos and conducted interviews with a number of leading politicians, including former president Barack Obama, Bernie Sanders, Elizabeth Warren, Hillary Clinton, and more.

In February 2021, Pitney together with Faiz Shakir launched More Perfect Union, a nonprofit media and advocacy outlet modeled on ThinkProgress. Shakir describes More Perfect Union, which creates video and graphics to support labor issues, as "ThinkProgress for a digital age."
