= Faiz Shakir =

American political operative (born 1979)

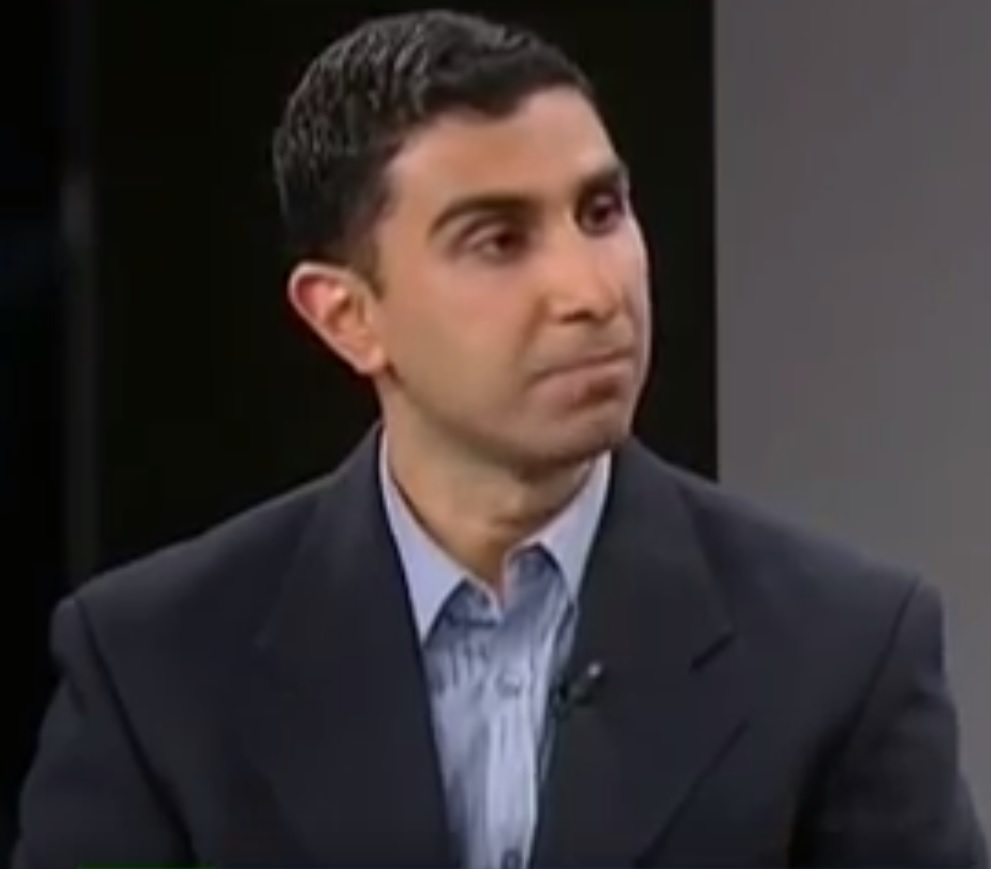
- Shakir in 2012
- Born: 1979 (age 46–47); Florida, US
- Education: Harvard University (BA); Georgetown University (JD)
- Occupation: Political operative
- Organization: More Perfect Union
- Known for: Managing Bernie Sanders' 2020 presidential campaign
- Political party: Democratic
- Spouse: Sarah Miller

Faiz Shakir (/fæz ʃəˈkɪər/; born 1979) is an American political advisor. A member of the Democratic Party, he serves as senior advisor to Bernie Sanders and executive director of the nonprofit media organization More Perfect Union. Previously, he was campaign manager for Bernie Sanders' 2020 presidential campaign, an aide to Congressional leaders Nancy Pelosi and Harry Reid, an editor-in-chief of the ThinkProgress blog, and political director of the American Civil Liberties Union. Raised in Florida by Pakistani immigrants, Shakir is a progressive liberal and an advocate for Muslim American communities.

== Early life and education ==
The son of Pakistani immigrants to the United States, Faiz Shakir was born and raised in Florida. Shakir completed his BA in government at Harvard University, and played on the Harvard Crimson baseball team for four years. Shakir earned a Juris Doctor from Georgetown University.

== Career ==
After graduating from law school, Shakir worked as a communications aide in the White House Office of National Drug Control Policy and as a legislative aide to Senator Bob Graham. He also worked on the John Kerry 2004 presidential campaign as a junior staffer. In 2005, Shakir began working for the Center for American Progress as a policy adviser. There, he helped launch the ThinkProgress blog in 2005, of which he was the editor-in-chief from 2007 to 2012.

In 2012, Shakir became House Democratic Leader Nancy Pelosi's director of new media. During that time, he was involved in advocacy for Muslim-American communities. After that, he served as a senior adviser to Democratic Senate Leader Harry Reid of Nevada. Reid's former deputy chief of staff commented, "Reid did not make a big decision without consulting Faiz. There's no one he trusted more on how the progressive community would react on something and no one whose advice he took more seriously on pushing him to the left." Shakir informally advised Bernie Sanders' 2016 campaign for the Democratic presidential nomination, which drew the ire of the Hillary Clinton campaign team. According to the Podesta emails, Clinton's campaign chair John Podesta chided Shakir for advising Sanders. "Gave him a very hard time", Podesta wrote to Neera Tanden about Shakir's involvement. "I have to say this does not go down easy with me."

Shakir joined the American Civil Liberties Union as its political director in January 2017. In March, he helped the ACLU launch the People Power website, which engages volunteers to mobilize in defence of civil liberties. Shakir had first pitched the idea for such a website to ACLU Director Anthony Romero in 2015; at that time, Romero had dismissed the idea as too radical. The website attracted 225,000 volunteers in eight weeks, coordinating projects such as meetings with judges to film screenings to panels on law enforcement and immigration.

Upon joining Sanders' 2020 presidential campaign in February 2019, Shakir became the first Muslim and first Pakistani-American campaign manager for a major party US presidential campaign.

He and Roger Lau (who worked for Elizabeth Warren's campaign) share the distinction of being the first Asian Americans to serve as campaign manager for a major American presidential candidate.

In February 2021, Shakir and Nico Pitney founded More Perfect Union, a nonprofit news and advocacy outlet modeled on ThinkProgress. Shakir describes More Perfect Union, which creates video and graphics to support labor issues, as "ThinkProgress for a digital age."

In mid-January 2025, Shakir announced his candidacy for chair of the Democratic National Committee (DNC). On February 1, 2025, he lost to DNC Chair race frontrunner Ken Martin.

== Personal life ==
Shakir is married to anti-monopoly advocate Sarah Miller.
