= Judd Legum =

American journalist

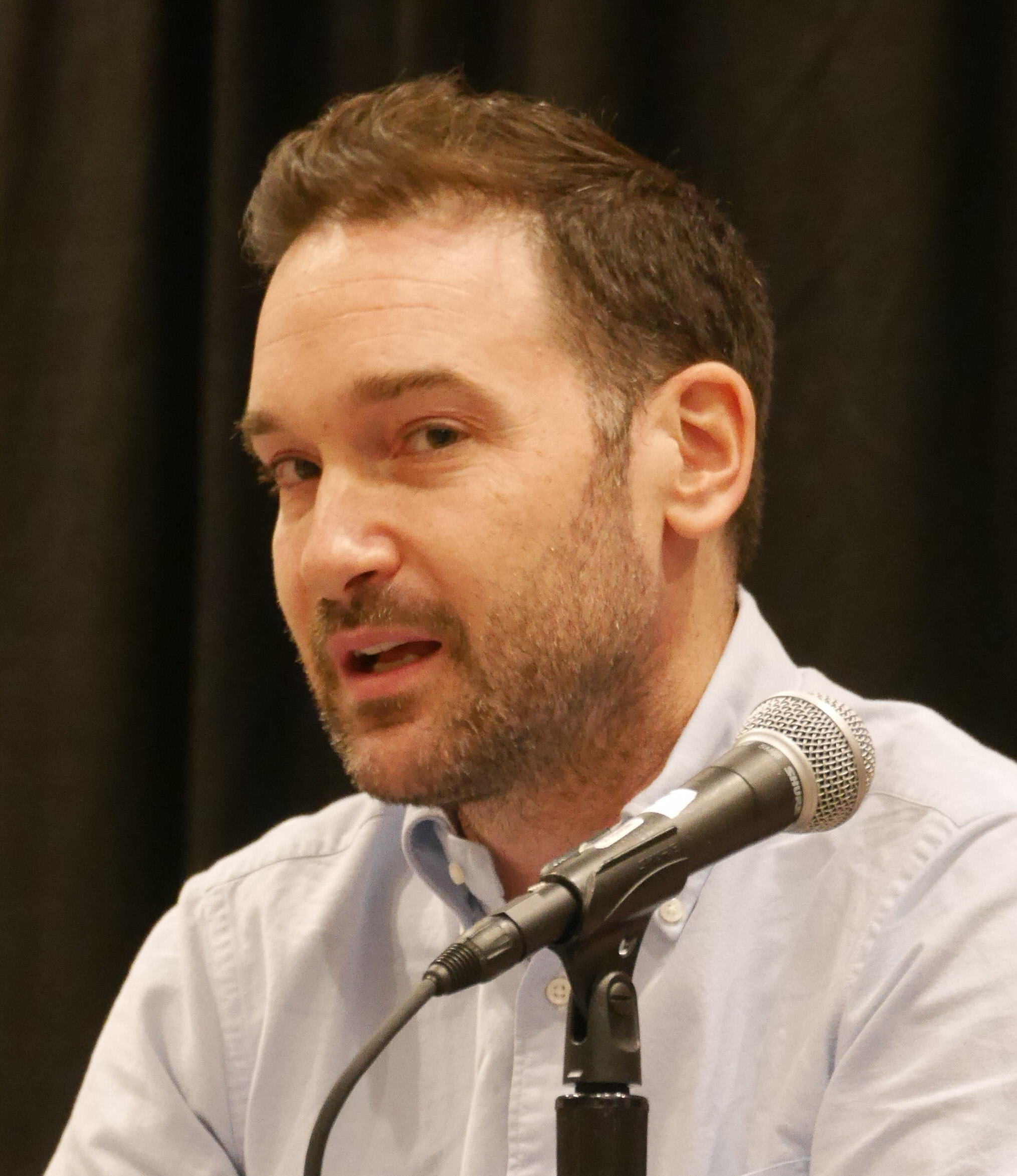
- Legum at South by Southwest 2018
- Born: December 8, 1978 (age 47); Annapolis, Maryland, U.S.
- Education: Pomona College (BA); Georgetown University (JD)
- Political party: Democratic

Judd Legum (born December 8, 1978) is an American journalist, lawyer, and political staffer. He is the founder and former editor of the progressive website ThinkProgress, and author of the political newsletter Popular Information.

== Early life ==
Judd Legum was born in Annapolis, Maryland. Legum earned a Bachelor of Arts in Public Policy analysis from Pomona College and a Juris Doctor from Georgetown University Law Center in 2003. After graduating from law school, Legum became a member of the Maryland State Bar Association.

== Career ==
Legum founded ThinkProgress in 2005, running it for two years before leaving in 2007 to join Hillary Clinton's presidential campaign as research director. Following the 2008 campaign, he practiced law in Maryland before returning to ThinkProgress in 2011, and became the site's editor-in-chief in May 2012. Under his supervision, the site grew up to a 40-person newsroom that earned 10 million unique visitors a month.

In 2010, Legum unsuccessfully ran for a seat in the Maryland House of Delegates.

Legum has drawn notice for reporting and commentary on a range of political topics, including the 2016 presidential campaign, campaign finance, the legacy of Martin Luther King in contemporary politics, and the media's role in politics.

In 2018, Legum announced he was leaving ThinkProgress to develop an independent newsletter, to be published through Substack. Legum joined Matt Taibbi and Daniel Lavery as early participants in the company's publishing model. Legum's newsletter, called Popular Information, was Substack's first politically focused publication. It launched July 23, 2018.

== Popular Information ==
Popular Information
- Type: Four times a week
- Format: Online
- Owner: Popular Information LLC
- Founder: Judd Legum
- Launched: 2018
- Political alignment: Progressive
- Headquarters: Washington, D.C.
- Circulation: 138,000 subscribers (January 2021)
- Website: popular.info

Popular Information is an American online newsletter launched in 2018 by Legum. As of January 2021 it had 138,000 subscribers with around 5%–10% paid subscriptions. The name of the newsletter comes from a letter James Madison wrote in 1822.

"A popular Government, without popular information, or the means of acquiring it, is but a Prologue to a Farce or a Tragedy; or, perhaps both. Knowledge will forever govern ignorance: And a people who mean to be their own Governors, must arm themselves with the power which knowledge gives." — James Madison, 1822

Legum authors the newsletter which is delivered through Substack, a company which provides services to support subscription newsletters. He says his newsletter is about politics and power, though he has covered many topics including corporate donations to politicians and Facebook's struggles with its advertising guidelines. He seeks out stories he thinks media outlets won't be covering and does a deep analysis, focusing on national issues. Legum's business model is to attract paying subscribers through delivering in-depth reporting while eschewing ad dollars, and the newsletter contains no advertising. In 2020, Popular Information was expanded by hiring a full-time research assistant.

In 2020 the Online News Association gave Popular Information an award for excellence in journalism, saying the newsletter had reported extensively on online misinformation, particularly focusing on Facebook, and that its reports on several nationwide companies created positive changes in working conditions for their employees. Its investigative reporting exposed a pro-Trump network of Facebook pages operating out of Ukraine, which were promptly shut down by Facebook, and the newsletter's reports have been cited in numerous national and local news outlets. According to Online News Association, "Popular Information demonstrates that newsletters can do far more than summarize the news. They can be a powerful vehicle to create change."
