= More Perfect Union (media organization) =

American progressive news organization

- Formation: February 2021; 5 years ago
- Founder: Faiz Shakir
- Tax ID no.: EIN: 85-3189807
- Legal status: 501(c)(3) nonprofit organization
- Method: Video journalism; advocacy reporting
- Budget: approx. $10 million (2026)
- Staff: approx. 30 (2026)
- Award: Full list
- Website: perfectunion.us

TikTok information
- Page: More Perfect Union
- Followers: 1.5 million

YouTube information
- Channel: More Perfect Union
- Subscribers: 4.31 million
- Views: 1 billion
- Last updated: November 21, 2026

More Perfect Union (MPU) is a progressive non-profit news media organization founded in February 2021 by Faiz Shakir. The outlet, named after a phrase in the U.S. Constitution, specializes in video reporting and opinion coverage about the American labor movement, economic policy, and corporate accountability. The aim of the news outlet is "building power for the working class".

It received the Sidney Award in 2021 for coverage of the Frito-Lay strike, and its explainer series The Class Room won a Hillman Prize in 2023 for opinion journalism. More Perfect Union also won the News and Documentary Emmy Award for Outstanding News Discussion & Analysis in both 2025 and 2026.

== Activities ==
=== Snack company strikes ===
In August 2021, More Perfect Union won the Sidney Award for its coverage of the Frito-Lay strike. "MPU was the first national outlet to cover the strike," the Sidney Hillman Foundation wrote in awarding the prize. "They published dispatches from the ground over a three-week period which collectively generated over 4 million views and spurred follow-on coverage by outlets such as The New York Times, The Washington Post, CNN, and NPR...After a three-week strike, Frito's Topeka plant struck an agreement to end the forced 7-day workweeks and so-called 'suicide shifts', which gave workers only 8 hours of break between shifts."

Also in August 2021, More Perfect Union confirmed with actor Danny DeVito that he had been stripped of his verified status on Twitter after he tweeted a message of solidarity to striking Nabisco workers: "No Contracts No Snacks." The news spread widely and contributed to DeVito and his rallying cry becoming popular labor memes.

=== The Class Room ===
In November 2021, More Perfect Union launched an explainer series called The Class Room. It is "aimed at providing a left-wing answer to PragerU, a YouTube titan of right-wing ideology," the New York Times reported.

=== Political coverage ===
In 2021, More Perfect Union was the first outlet to report on a leaked draft of a controversial Ohio voting reform bill backed by Republican lawmakers, describing it as a "devastating new voter suppression bill." The group highlighted provisions such as requiring two forms of ID for mail or early voting, banning ballot drop boxes, cutting early voting, and ending state-paid ballot postage. Two years later, the outlet released footage of President Joe Biden meeting union organizers and reported on his appearance at a United Auto Workers picket line, noting that the organization played a coordinating role.

By the end of 2024, the organization published a video interview with President Joe Biden in which he publicly endorsed a ban on congressional stock trading. The Associated Press reviewed the interview before its release. In 2025, the media platform launched a national billboard campaign to raise awareness about the effects of federal staffing cuts on public safety in national parks. Approximately 300 billboards were placed across Arizona, Nevada, Ohio, Pennsylvania, and Florida. The initiative responded to workforce reductions under the U.S. Department of Government Efficiency, which had led to a significant decrease in National Park Service personnel. The Minnesota Star Tribune noted that the campaign aimed to criticize staffing reductions linked to DOGE by emphasizing potential safety risks at national parks.

=== More Perfect University ===
In April 2026, MPU launched More Perfect University (MPUniversity) to organize students on college campuses as a progressive alternative to Turning Point USA. In May 2026, the organization coordinated a rental rip-off hearing in the Bronx alongside New York City mayor Zohran Mamdani and housing official Cea Weaver to address housing affordability and support the development of tenant unions.

== Organization and leadership ==
More Perfect Union is led by Faiz Shakir. As of 2023, the organization had approximately 28 full-time employees. By 2026, it had grown to a staff of about 30 employees and was operating with an annual budget of approximately $10 million.

== Funding ==
More Perfect Union is funded by philanthropic donors and does not accept contributions from corporations or labor unions. Reported donors include the Marguerite Casey Foundation, the Open Society Foundations, the Ford Foundation, and entities linked to Pierre Omidyar.

== Reception ==
More Perfect Union is recognized as part of the progressive digital media landscape. The organization surpassed 100 million total video views across all its social media platforms in 2022. As of January 2025, its YouTube channel had over 1.3 million subscribers. The New York Times described the outlet as "the most ambitious new entrant" in the resurgent labor media landscape in 2021. In February 2026, The Washington Post called it "one of the fastest-growing left-wing pages on YouTube" and a "closely watched experiment" in whether the political left could compete with the right-wing media sphere, noting that it avoids personality-driven formats and overtly partisan outrage.

=== Accolades ===
In 2021, More Perfect Union received the Sidney Award for its coverage of the Frito-Lay strike. Its explainer series, The Class Room, won the Hillman Prize for opinion journalism in 2023. The organization also won three Webby Awards in 2025. Additionally, in both 2025 and 2026, the News and Documentary Emmy Award for Outstanding News Discussion & Analysis was presented to More Perfect Union.

Organizations (Note: Awards, honors and other miscellaneous organizations are listed in alphabetical order.)	Year (Note: Year in which award ceremony was held.)	Category	Work	Result	Ref.
News and Documentary Emmy Awards	2025	Outstanding Light Feature Story: Short Form	How Tyson Captured All The Pork You Eat (And Made Billions)	Nominated	
News and Documentary Emmy Awards	2025	Outstanding News Discussion & Analysis	Elliott County Voted for Democrats For 144 Years. Then Came Trump...	Won	
News and Documentary Emmy Awards	2026	Outstanding Climate, Environment and Weather Coverage	We Went to the Town Elon Musk is Poisoning	Nominated	
News and Documentary Emmy Awards	2026	Outstanding Interview: Long Form	Why Young Men Don't Like the Democrats	Nominated	
News and Documentary Emmy Awards	2026	Outstanding Investigative News Coverage: Long Form	We Had 400 People Shop For Groceries. What We Found Will Shock You	Nominated	
News and Documentary Emmy Awards	2026	Outstanding Light Feature Story: Long Form	I Took Bernie Into Deep Trump Country. Can He Win Them Over?	Nominated	
News and Documentary Emmy Awards	2026	Outstanding News Discussion & Analysis	Deport Them All: Who's to Blame for Springfield's Immigrant Crisis?	Won	
News and Documentary Emmy Awards	2026	Outstanding Science and Technology Coverage	AI Chatbots Sent Him Spiraling. Then He Contacted Me	Nominated	
The Sidney Hillman Foundation	2021	Sidney Award for Agenda-Setting Coverage of the 2021 Frito-Lay strike	—	Won	
The Sidney Hillman Foundation	2023	Hillman Prize for Opinion & Analysis	The Class Room	Won	
Webby Awards	2025	News & Politics (Series & Channels)	More Perfect Union: YouTube Channel	Won	
Webby Awards	2025	Public Service & Activism	Modern Day Slavery: Alabama’s Prison Labor Scheme	Won	
Webby Awards	2025	People's Voice	Modern Day Slavery: Alabama’s Prison Labor Scheme	Won	
