= 2021 Democratic National Committee chairmanship election =

- January 18–21, 2021
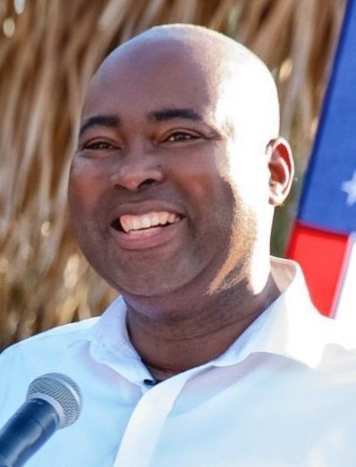

| Candidate | Jaime Harrison | No vote |
| Caucus vote | 407 | 4 |
| Percentage | 99.02% | 0.98% |
Chair before election
Tom Perez
Elected Chair
Jaime Harrison

The 2021 Democratic National Committee chairmanship election was held on January 18–21, 2021, using an electronic ballot to determine the next chairperson of the Democratic National Committee (DNC).

In contrast to the 2017 election, the 2021 DNC election was uncontested. Jaime Harrison was elected chairperson in the first round of voting, succeeding Tom Perez.

== Candidates ==
On January 14, Joe Biden selected his preferred DNC leadership slate, including Jaime Harrison for chair, Jason Rae as secretary, Virginia McGregor as treasurer, and Chris Korge as national finance chair. As is usual when a Democrat controls the White House, nobody else submitted a slate of officers.

== Results ==
On January 18–21, the DNC voted on the leadership slate, with 407 in favor, 4 against, and 0 abstaining. As a result, Harrison became DNC Chair. Harrison highlighted the need to grow the Democratic Party in red states.

Results of the January 21, 2021 Democratic National Committee officer elections:

| Candidate | Round 1 |
|---|---|
| Jaime Harrison | 407 |
| No vote | 4 |
| Abstain | 0 |
| Total | 411 |

Candidate secured enough votes to win election
Candidate secured a plurality of votes in the round
Candidate withdrew

The DNC elected Gretchen Whitmer, Tammy Duckworth, and Filemon Vela as vice-chairs and Keisha Lance Bottoms as vice-chair of civic engagement and voter protection. Later, in 2022, the DNC unanimously voted to add Henry R. Muñoz III as a 4th vice chair.

== Structural reform proposals ==
In 2020, 41 DNC members wrote a letter to Biden asking the DNC to make a series of reforms, including publicizing the list of DNC members, publicizing DNC votes & resolutions, reducing the number and power of the 75 at-large DNC members, and changing the election of these members from a slate election (yes/no vote on each slate) to a candidate election (yes/no on each candidate). In 2021, before voting on the leadership slate, the DNC voted on the rules of the election, with 318 voting for, 15 against, and 11 abstaining. One "no" voter on the leadership slate opposed the election of leaders as a slate, rather than individual candidates.

== See also ==
- 2023 Republican National Committee chairmanship election
