= 2021 Frito-Lay strike =

Labor strike in Topeka, Kansas

- Date: July 5–23, 2021
- Location: Topeka, Kansas, United States
- Caused by: Long hours; Mandatory overtime; Lack of pay raise
- Methods: Demonstrations, internet activism, walkout
- Result: Union agreeing to a new contract that guarantees workers get one day off a week and no longer have to work "suicide shifts"

Parties
BCTGM Local 218; AFL–CIO; DSAKC; IBT; IWW	PepsiCo; Frito-Lay

Lead figures
Anthony Shelton; David Woods; Brent Hall	Ramon Laguarta; Steven Williams

Number
600	

The 2021 Frito-Lay strike was a labor strike by employees at the Topeka, Kansas Frito-Lay plant against the company's mandatory overtime policy. The strike began on July 5, 2021 and ended on July 23, 2021.

== Background ==
Frito-Lay has a contract with the Local 218 chapter of the Bakery, Confectionery, Tobacco Workers and Grain Millers' International Union, which represents Topeka, Kansas. The warehouse employs approximately 700 to 800 workers, 600 of which are members of the BCTGM 218 chapter. Every two years, Frito-Lay and the BCTGM negotiate a contract for employee wages and conditions. The most recent contract negotiations fell through after workers rejected a contract that had been recommended by union leadership and a work stoppage and strike occurred in response.

== Strike ==
The strike began on July 5, 2021, when approximately 600 members of the Local 218 chapter of the Bakery, Confectionery, Tobacco Workers and Grain Millers' International Union (BCTGM) went on strike. According to a report by Mic and Food & Wine, this represented approximately 80 percent of the workforce at the Topeka, Kansas plant for Frito-Lay.

It was the first time the Local 218 chapter of the BCTGM union went on strike since 1973. The reasons for the strike, per the union, were that employees were working as many as 12-hour days, up to 7 days a week under mandatory overtime, as well as shifts with an only eight-hour break between them, which employees often refer to as "suicide shifts". Wages had been stagnant for 15 years, and the new contract only promises a low merit-based increase of up to two percent. Some union members said that their wages had only increased 77 cents per hour in the last 12 years.

The strike ended July 23 with the workers getting a contract with the company that guarantees one day off a week. The new contract does away with "suicide shifts", although mandatory overtime is still in effect.

== Reactions ==
=== Frito-Lay ===
Frito-Lay denied any wrongdoing on their part, and claimed that the strike is a result of union leadership, stating that "union leadership is out of touch with the sentiments of Frito-Lay employees" and "we do not anticipate any further negotiations with the union for the foreseeable future. Frito-Lay will be focused on continuing to run the operations of our plant in Topeka and has a contingency plan in place to ensure employee safety. We will continue to be attentive to the situation and welcome any employees who wish to continue to work as they are legally entitled to do so."

=== Political organizations ===
The Kansas City chapter of the Democratic Socialists of America expressed solidarity with the strike and provided fundraising for striking workers.

=== Other unions ===
Members from the International Brotherhood of Teamsters and the Industrial Workers of the World picketed with BCTGM workers, and provided food and financial assistance. The Heartland IWW chapter, which represents Wobblies that live in the Kansas City area provided solidarity and fundraising during the contract negotiations with Frito-Lay and BCTGM during March 2021.

== Impact ==
As a consequence of the strike, many grocery and convenience stores in the Kansas City metro area faced a chip shortage within 5 days of the strike.

== See also ==
- Strikes during the COVID-19 pandemic
