= Chuck Rocha =

American political strategist

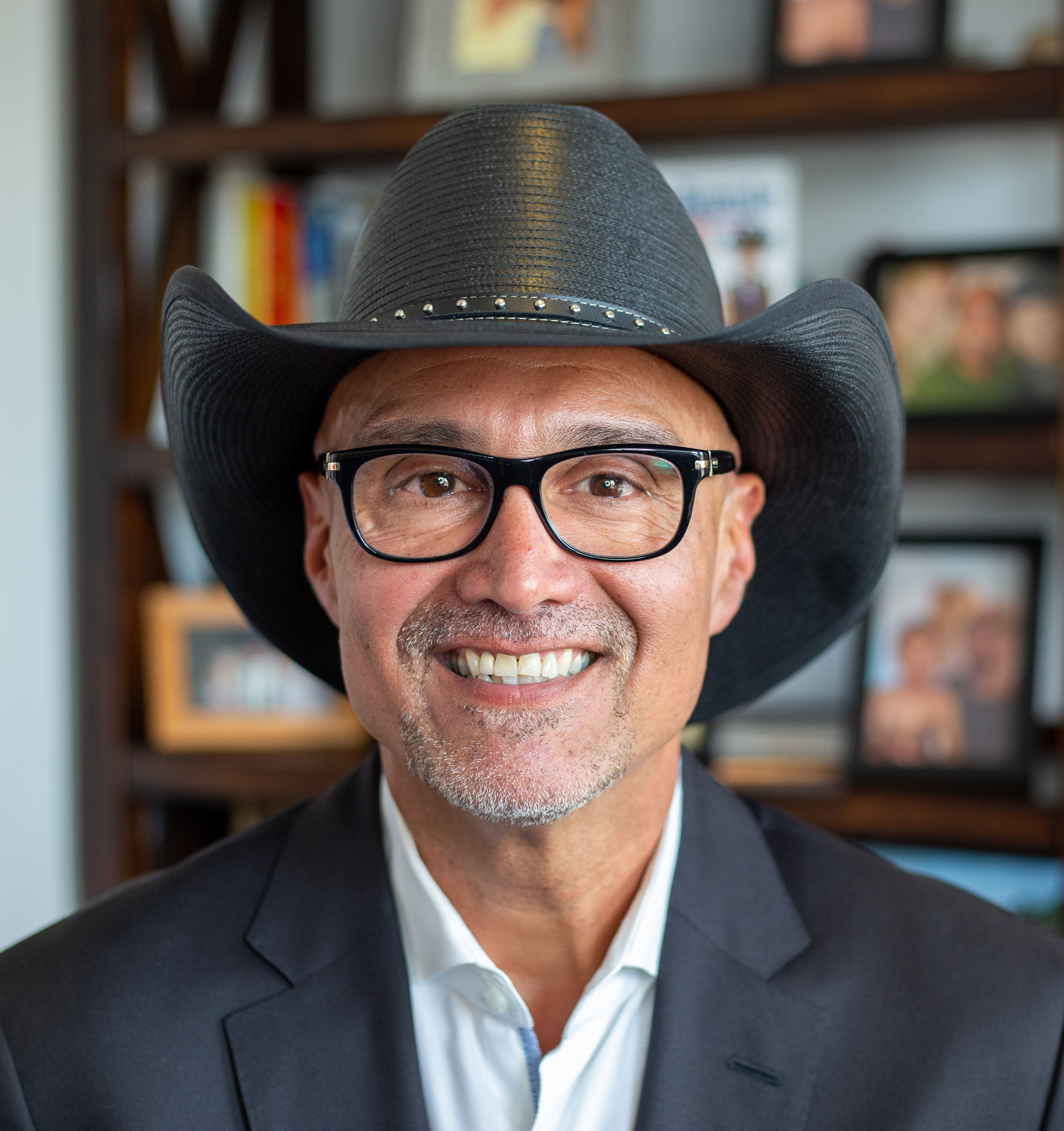
- Rocha in 2021
- Born: 1969 (age 56–57); Tyler, Texas, U.S.
- Occupations: Political consultant; Democratic Party strategist; president of Solidarity Strategies
- Political party: Democratic
- Spouse: Ebony Payne

Chuck Rocha is an American political consultant who is the founder and president of Solidarity Strategies. He is a TV contributor at CBS News and makes regular appearances on major cable news programs, including CNN and MS NOW. He is Mexican American, a Democratic Party strategist, and former union organizer. In April 2020, the former Bernie Sanders 2020 presidential campaign advisor founded the partisan super PAC Nuestro PAC to turn out Latinos in the 2020 general election. In 2025 he co-founded CAMPEONES PAC with former congressman Tony Cardenas to lead the charge in engaging, mobilizing, and turning out Latino voters in key states. He was born and raised in Tyler, Texas.

== Career ==
Chuck began his political career in East Texas at United Rubber Workers Local 746. By 22, he had become the youngest officer of the 1,200 person local. At 29, he was hired to be the youngest and first person of color political director of the United Steelworkers. He is credited for building out one of the top national labor political departments in the country.

=== Solidarity Strategies ===
In 2010, Rocha left the USW to create Solidarity Strategies, a full-service nonprofit and political consulting firm. Solidarity was built on the idea of diversity, inclusion and mentorship opportunities for the next generation of minority professionals. Since its founding, Solidarity has employed and trained over 130 young people of color and has become one of the most successful minority-owned political consulting firms in the nation.

In 2013, Rocha was convicted of embezzling money from the United Steel Workers."Rocha pleaded guilty in 2013 to one felony count of union embezzlement for stealing funds from the United Steelworkers union in 2008 and 2009, when he was its political director. He also “acknowledged responsibility for the other 17 counts,” according to the Labor Department’s Office of Labor-Management Standards. His plea deal barred him from working as an officer or agent at a labor organization until 2026."

In 2023, Solidarity Strategies was named Creative Agency of the Year by Campaign & Elections. Chuck was also named to Politico’s 2022 Recast Power List, honoring the top 40 most influential people on race and politics, and was awarded General Consultant of the Year by GAIN Power’s 2022 Powerful Idea Awards. He has received numerous accolades for both his personal advocacy and his firm’s award-winning creative in mail, TV, and digital media.

Chuck has worked on several presidential, congressional and gubernatorial races, including both of Bernie Sanders' presidential campaigns.

Rocha was an advisor in Ruben Gallego’s successful 2024 campaign for U.S. Senate, helping to craft a winning strategy that mobilized Latino voters and secured a historic victory in Arizona.

== Personal life ==
Rocha grew up in East Texas. Rocha is Mexican American. He was a single father at twenty, and has since become a grandparent. In August 2024, he married Ebony Payne. He often says that his greatest accomplishments are his twin grandsons, Wyatt and Rowan.

Chuck serves on several boards, including Leaders of Color, the Florida Fishing Guides Association Trust, and the National Wildlife Federation Board.
