= Bernie Sanders 2020 presidential campaign =

American political campaign

Bernie Sanders for President 2020
- Campaign: 2020 United States presidential election (Democratic Party primaries)
- Candidate: Bernie Sanders; U.S. Senator from Vermont (2007–present)
- Affiliation: Democratic Party (served as an independent in Senate)
- Status: Withdrawn
- Announced: February 19, 2019
- Suspended: April 8, 2020
- Headquarters: Burlington, Vermont; Washington, D.C.
- Key people: Ben Cohen (national co-chair); Ro Khanna (national co-chair); Nina Turner (national co-chair); Carmen Yulín Cruz (national co-chair); Faiz Shakir (campaign manager); Analilia Mejia (national political director); Briahna Joy Gray (press secretary); Chuck Rocha (senior adviser); Jess Mazour (Iowa political director)
- Receipts: US$108,912,139.51 (December 31, 2019)
- Slogan(s): Feel the Bern; Not me. Us.

Website
- berniesanders.com (archived - February 19, 2020)

The 2020 presidential campaign of Bernie Sanders was an election campaign from the junior United States senator from Vermont. It began with Sanders's formal announcement on February 19, 2019. The announcement followed widespread speculation that he would run again after running unsuccessfully in the 2016 Democratic presidential primaries.

Sanders consistently polled among the top three Democratic candidates nationally. Sanders raised $6 million in the first 24 hours of his announcement, beating out Kamala Harris's $1.6 million for the highest amount raised on day one. Sanders raised $10 million in the first week after launching his campaign. Within each of the four quarters of 2019, Sanders' campaign raised $18.2 million, $18 million, $25.3 million, and $34.5 million, respectively. In the first, third and fourth quarters, the campaign had the largest haul for any candidate in the Democratic field. In the second quarter, he was outraised by Elizabeth Warren. On September 19, 2019, Sanders' campaign announced that they had reached 1 million individual donors, becoming the fastest presidential campaign in history to do so. As of January 2020, Sanders had raised more money than any other Democratic candidate, and only self-funded billionaires Tom Steyer and Michael Bloomberg had more cash on hand.

The national co-chairs of the campaign were Ben & Jerry's co-founder Ben Cohen, U.S. representative Ro Khanna, Our Revolution president Nina Turner, and San Juan mayor Carmen Yulín Cruz. The campaign manager was Faiz Shakir.

Sanders suspended his presidential campaign on April 8, 2020, following a string of losses to his chief rival Joe Biden and a dwindling path to the nomination. He endorsed Biden on April 13.

== Background ==
Sanders' 2020 campaign was his second run for the Democratic nomination, following his campaign in the 2016 primaries. He entered the 2020 Democratic Party presidential primaries as a heavyweight candidate, as compared to his prior 2016 underdog campaign. Had Sanders won the presidency, he would have been the first Jewish president and the oldest president at the time of inauguration.

Sanders joined the 2020 race with the advantages of a large online donor base and having his policy ideas accepted into the Democratic mainstream. In a crowded field of primary candidates, Sanders had the largest infrastructure in waiting but was likely to see his supporter base fragmented, as compared to his head-to-head campaign in 2016. While policies such as single-payer healthcare and tuition-free public colleges have entered mainstream Democratic thought since his 2016 campaign, some Democratic leaders doubted the breadth of his appeal.

On February 19, 2019, Sanders announced on Vermont Public Radio that he was running for the 2020 United States presidential election. On the same day, he announced his campaign in an email to his supporters and in an interview with John Dickerson on CBS This Morning.

== Campaign ==
On March 15, 2019, Sanders' campaign announced that its workers had unionized with UFCW Local 400, making it the first-ever major presidential campaign with a unionized workforce. The Sanders campaign promised to offset its greenhouse gas emissions while traveling by contributing to renewable energy projects.

=== Staff and leadership ===
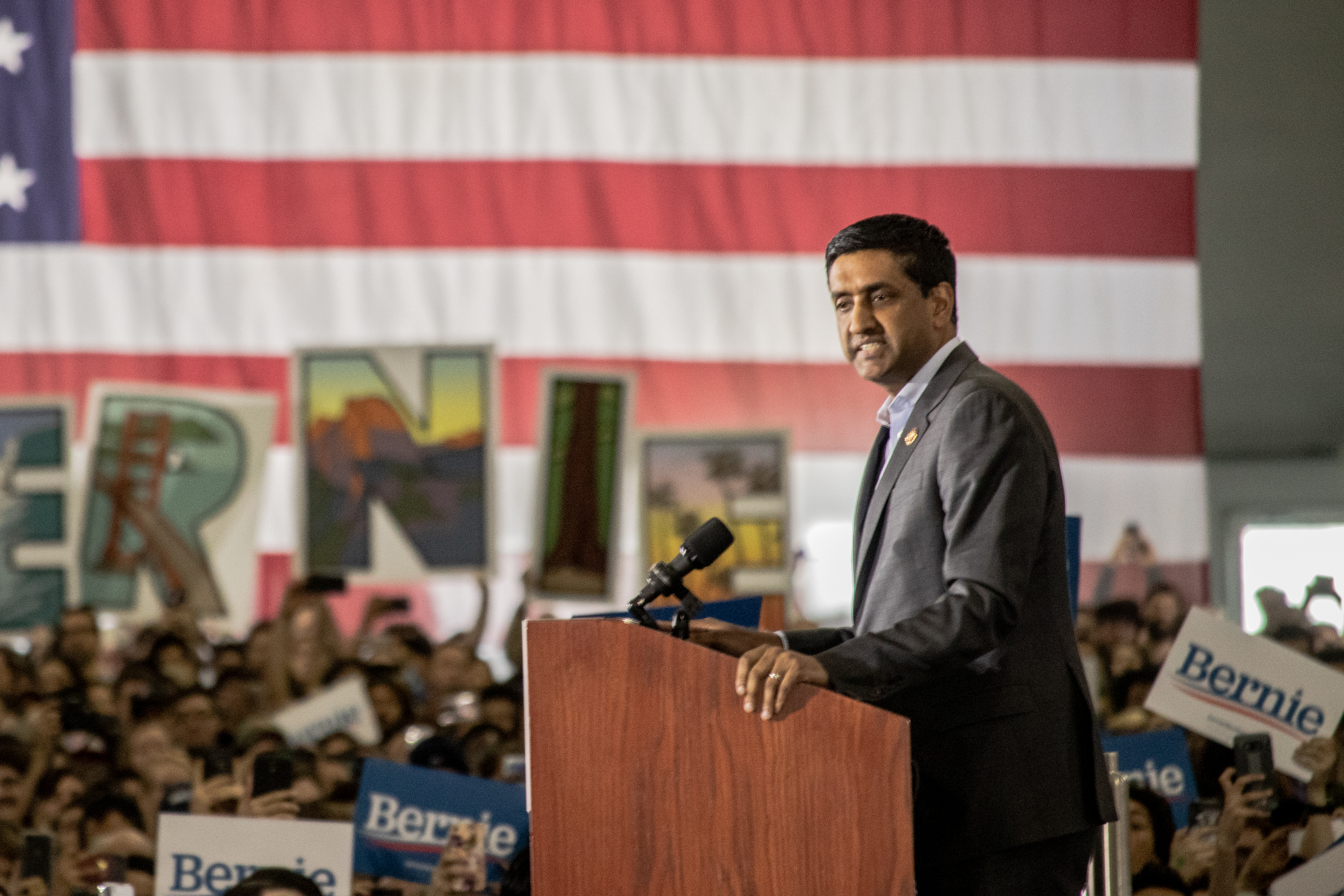
Campaign co-chair Ro Khanna speaks at a rally for Sanders in San Jose, California

On February 21, 2019, Sanders' campaign announced its national campaign co-chairs: Ben & Jerry's co-founder Ben Cohen, Rep. Ro Khanna, Our Revolution president Nina Turner, and San Juan mayor Carmen Yulín Cruz.

The campaign manager was Faiz Shakir, the political director was Analilia Mejia, and the communications director was Carli Stevenson. Other staff and advisors included deputy political director Sarah Badawi and senior advisor for the campaign Chuck Rocha; deputy press secretary Belén Sisa; senior advisors Phillip Agnew, Pete D’Alessandro and Kurt Ehrenberg; and foreign policy advisor Matt Duss. Shakir's role as campaign manager may have made him the first Muslim campaign manager for a major party U.S. presidential campaign.

=== Fundraising ===
Fundraising totals are closely watched because they are an indicator of a candidate's support. Within three-and-a-half hours after his announcement, Sanders had raised over $1 million from small donations from all 50 states, quickly overtaking the amount rival candidate Kamala Harris raised in the first full day after her presidential announcement. Within 12 hours, Sanders had raised over $4 million from 150,000 donors, and in the first 24 hours following his announcement, Sanders raised $5.9 million from 225,000 individual donors, with the average donation being $27. Within a week of his announcement Sanders had raised $10 million from 359,914 donors; donors who did not donate to his 2016 campaign stood for 39% of the donations, and registered Republican donors numbered approximately 12,000. By April 1, Sanders had raised $18.2 million, leading the amounts raised by all other Democratic candidates. About 20 percent of donors were new supporters and the average donation was $20. On July 2, Sanders campaign manager Faiz Shakir announced to reporters that the campaign had raised $18 million in the second quarter of 2019 in addition to having transferred an additional $6 million from other campaign accounts. Shakir added that 99% of the donations were $100 or less with an average contribution size of $18 and that the campaign received 2 million the day after the Miami Democratic debate. On July 31, Shakir announced that the Sanders campaign had raised 1.1 million from over 70,000 donations since the Detroit Democratic debate the previous night, which Shakir credited Sanders for commanding and using to leave "absolutely no doubt that he is the best candidate ready to take this fight to Donald Trump and finally bring the change we need to America." As with his 2016 campaign, donors have the option to donate exactly $27 to the campaign, the average amount donated to Bernie at one point in the 2016 campaign. On September 19, 2019, Sanders' campaign announced that they had reached 1 million individual donors, becoming the fastest presidential campaign in history to achieve that milestone.

On October 1, 2019, Sanders' campaign announced that it raised $25.3 million (~$31.4 million in 2025) in the third quarter. On January 1, 2020, the Sanders campaign announced that they had raised $34.5 million during the final quarter of 2019, the highest amount in a single quarter of any candidate. On February 6, 2020, the Sanders campaign announced it raised $25 million in January 2020, more than any other candidate raised during any entire quarter of 2019.

=== Public speaking events ===
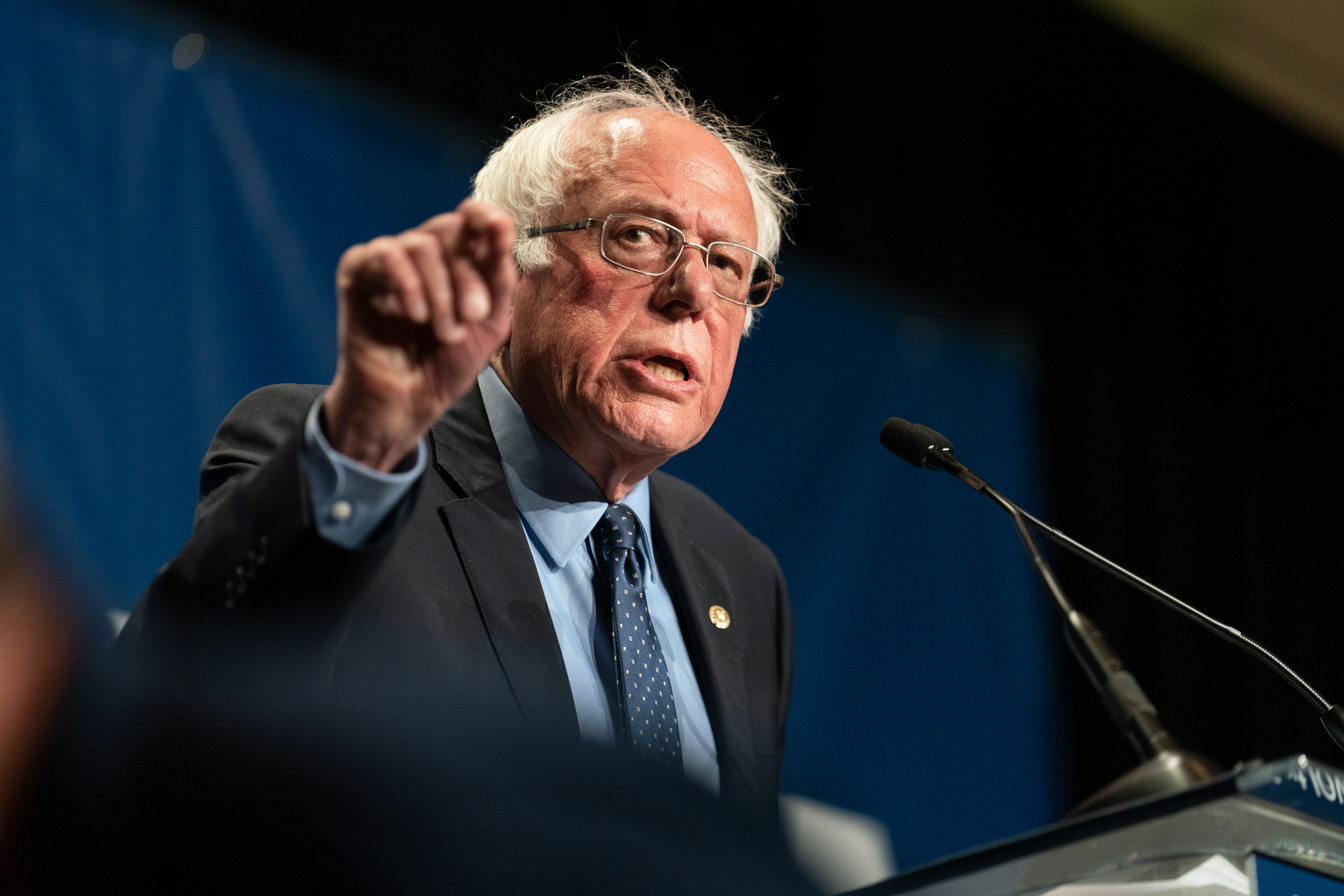
Sanders speaking at the June 9, 2019 Iowa Democrats Hall of Fame Celebration in Cedar Rapids, Iowa

Sanders held a kickoff rally at New York City's Brooklyn College (his alma mater) on March 2, 2019, with an estimated crowd of around 13,000 in attendance. In addition to his well-known positions on income equality and societal reform, Sanders also spoke about his personal life, which was something that he had hesitated to do in his first presidential campaign. Sanders spoke about the influence that his working-class upbringing in Brooklyn and the experiences of his father, a Jewish immigrant who had fled from anti-Semitism and poverty in Poland, had on his life. Sanders said "I know where I came from, and that is something I will never forget. Unlike Donald Trump, who shut down the government and left 800,000 federal employees without income to pay the bills, I know what it's like to be in a family that lives paycheck to paycheck."

On March 3, Sanders spoke in Selma, Alabama, at a commemoration event held to remember the civil rights march known as Bloody Sunday. Later that day, Sanders held his second rally in Chicago, Illinois. As at his first event, he spoke about income and social equality, but in Chicago, Sanders spoke more extensively against racial disparities. Sanders discussed his personal involvement in the civil rights movement, including his leading role in the 1962 University of Chicago sit-ins and his participation in the 1963 March on Washington for Jobs and Freedom, where Martin Luther King Jr. delivered his famous "I Have a Dream" speech.

On April 13, Sanders delivered an address to service trade union members in Coopersville, Michigan where he pledged to do everything he could to prevent President Trump's reelection and declared that a Sanders administration would "use the power of the federal government to say to large, profitable corporations, 'treat your workers with respect.'"

On May 5, Sanders gave a speech at the Mitchell County Fairgrounds in Osage, Iowa, calling for radical changes to the agricultural economy of the United States including different policy approaches for farm subsidies, supply management programs and rural investments and cited the need for new anti-trust measures to combat the "growing monopolization of agriculture."

On June 12, Sanders gave a speech at George Washington University defining and defending his vision of democratic socialism, saying it was an imperative in order to both defeat Trump in the upcoming election and bring systemic change to the United States.

On June 28, Sanders addressed the National Newspaper Publisher's Association's (NNPA) convention at the Westin Hotel in Cincinnati, Ohio, where he spoke about his campaign's policies and opined that there was "no excuse for white families to own 10 times more wealth than black families."

On July 17, Sanders gave another speech at George Washington University, defending his Medicare for All proposal against critique of it as unrealistic and overly disruptive and its benefits toward seniors through providing them with access to dental, vision and other benefits that were presently not covered by Medicare.

On July 23, Sanders and Elizabeth Warren spoke at a rally of organized airline industry workers at Reagan National Airport, Sanders saying that they had a simple request of wanting Sky Chefs, Gate Gourmet, and American Airlines to pay "workers living wages and provide decent health care."

On July 24, Sanders spoke at the annual NAACP convention in Detroit, Michigan, where he and Amy Klobuchar stated their support for a plan put forth by South Carolina Representative Jim Clyburn to put significant investments in impoverished communities when asked if they supported reparations for slavery.

On August 7, Sanders held a rally at Long Beach City College in Long Beach, California, where he advocated for his Senate colleagues to pass legislation raising the federal minimum wage to $15 an hour that had been passed in the House the previous month as well as the implementation of a ban on the sale and distribution of assault-style rifles.

On August 8, Sanders delivered a speech at the National Association of Black Journalists convention in Miami, Florida, saying that his proposal to make college and health care free while taxing the wealthy would "disproportionately" assist black communities and described how his plan to forgive student loan debt would lift a burden that kept young people struggling.

=== Televised forums and podcast appearances ===
On April 6, Sanders participated in a Fox News town hall which attracted more than 2.55 million viewers, with Fox seeing an increase of total viewers by 24 percent and 40 percent among people aged 25 to 54, surpassing the ratings of all prior 2020 Democratic presidential candidate town halls. On April 24, he participated in the She the People forum at Texas Southern University in Houston, Texas, and on April 22, he participated in a town hall meeting sponsored by CNN.

In June, Sanders delivered remarks at the California Democratic Party Convention in San Francisco. During July, Sanders participated in the presidential forum of the National Education Association in Honolulu, Hawaii, a town hall in Las Vegas, Nevada, and at a The Washington Post public interview event with Robert Costa, drawing laughter from the audience when he asked if Bank of America was really sponsoring his appearance, in reference to the bank's logo being behind the pair. In August, Sanders delivered remarks at a presidential forum in Las Vegas as news broke of the 2019 El Paso shooting.

On August 6, Sanders appeared on The Joe Rogan Experience. Newsweek commented on his appearance, saying that while some praised Joe Rogan for "hosting a pragmatic discussion" others "seemed rather stunned by Sanders's decision to appear on the show at all." Following the podcast, Rogan became a top-trending topic on Twitter.

On November 16, 2019, Sanders participated in a presidential town hall at the California Democratic Party Convention. Following the event, supporters of Sanders celebrated his campaign for Medicare for All and a Green New Deal in the lobby of the convention hall, where Sanders banners were draped over the railings.

=== Health concerns and return to campaigning ===
Sanders was hospitalized on October 1, 2019, after experiencing chest pains at a campaign event in Las Vegas. He was diagnosed with a heart attack, and a routine operation was performed to insert two stents to address a blockage in an artery. Scheduled campaign events and appearances were canceled until further notice, but he confirmed that he would be in the October debate.

On October 19, 2019, Sanders accepted the endorsement of Representative Alexandria Ocasio-Cortez at a rally in Queens, New York. The Queens rally had almost 26,000 attendees, making it the largest rally held by a 2020 Democratic primary candidate by attendance.

In December 2019, three months after experiencing a heart attack, Sanders released three letters from physicians detailing his health. A letter from Attending Physician of Congress Brian P. Monahan declared Sanders "in good health currently" and detailed his discontinuation of use of beta blockers and blood thinning medication prescribed to him after the procedure, while letters from two cardiologists also declared Sanders as healthy. Even after releasing the letters, Sanders faced criticism from other candidates for failing to be transparent about his health condition. Defending Sanders, his spokeswoman Briahna Joy Gray falsely claimed that Mike Bloomberg had also "suffered heart attacks in the past." Gray later issued a statement saying she had misspoken: "I misspoke when I said Bloomberg had a heart attack. Rather, he underwent the same stent procedure as Bernie. Bernie released 3 detailed medical reports in December — just like the other candidates."

=== Iowa and Nevada caucuses ===
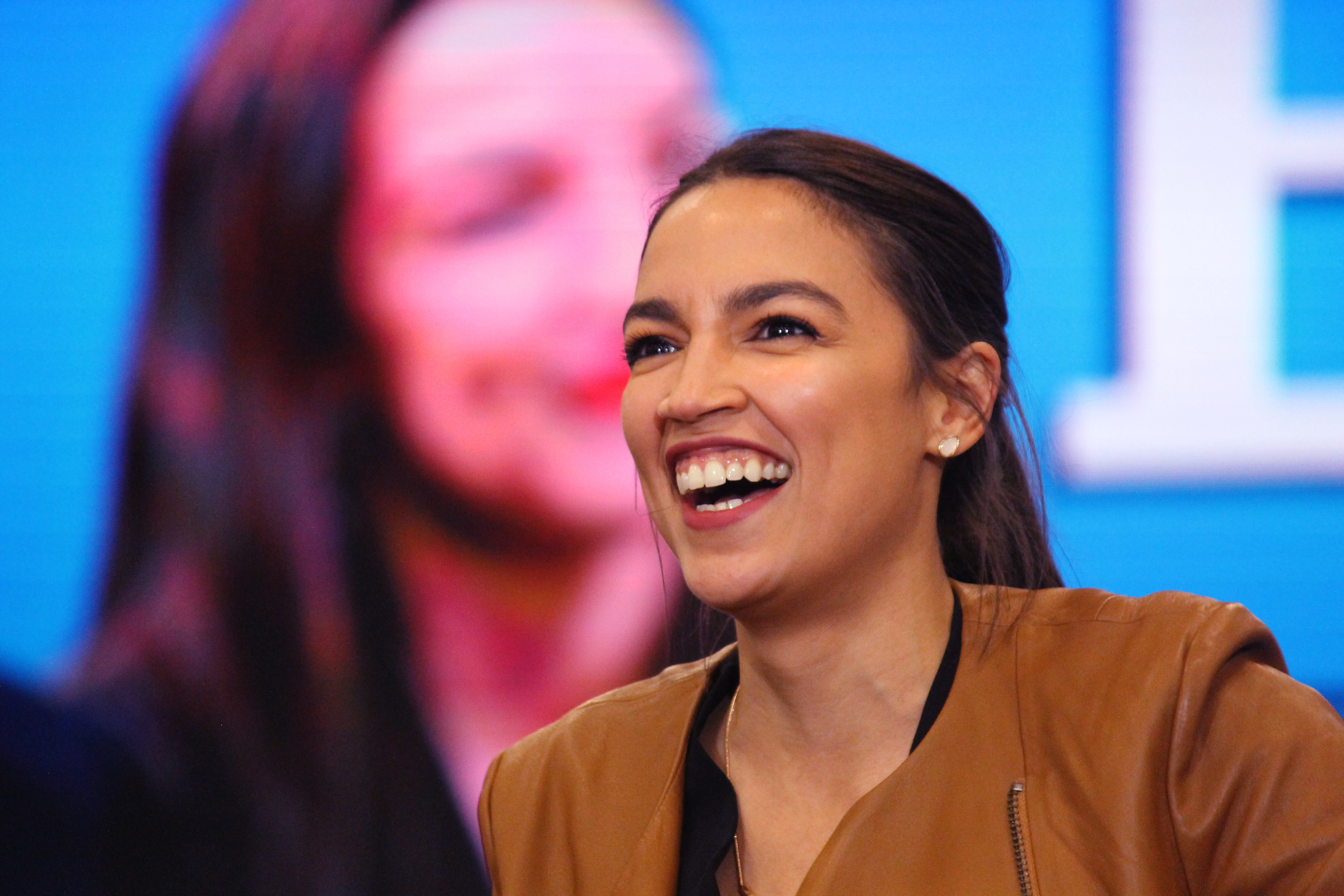
U.S. representative Alexandria Ocasio-Cortez stumping for Sanders at a November 8, 2019 rally in Council Bluffs, Iowa

Following his winning the popular vote in the 2020 Iowa Democratic caucuses, the popular vote and delegate count in the New Hampshire Democratic primary, and a significant surge in national polls, Sanders emerged as a front-runner in the 2020 primaries. Sanders surpassed Joe Biden in the RealClearPolitics average for the first time ever on February 10, 2020. Some more moderate Democrats have expressed concerns that a Sanders nomination could cause a down-ballot effect favoring Republican candidates, while others have argued that a progressive nominee such as Sanders could benefit from a greater turnout of young and historically disenfranchised voters. Congressional Democratic leaders Nancy Pelosi and Chuck Schumer have both indicated they would be comfortable with Sanders at the top of the ticket, and attempted to allay fears about Sanders' influence down-ballot.

Sanders has faced criticism for the toxic online behavior of some of his supporters, especially following the Culinary Workers Union's decision not to endorse him. The union claimed that this was in part due to online harassment union leaders received from Sanders supporters after distributing a flyer criticizing Sanders's healthcare policy. At the Democratic debate on February 19, Sanders suggested that such behavior represents only a small fraction of his base and that some of his alleged online supporters may be Russian bots. A spokesperson for Twitter said there was no evidence backing Sanders's claim. On February 22, it was reported that Russia had been attempting to interfere in the primaries to support Sanders. In response, Sanders denounced Russian election interference, stating, "If elected president, trust me, [Putin is] not going to be interfering in American elections." He said that his campaign was briefed about Russia's alleged efforts about a month before. The following day, Sanders won the Nevada caucuses. Sanders once again condemned Putin at the Democratic debate in Charleston, South Carolina, on February 25. In February 2020, he temporarily became the race's front-runner.

=== Super Tuesday and subsequent voting ===
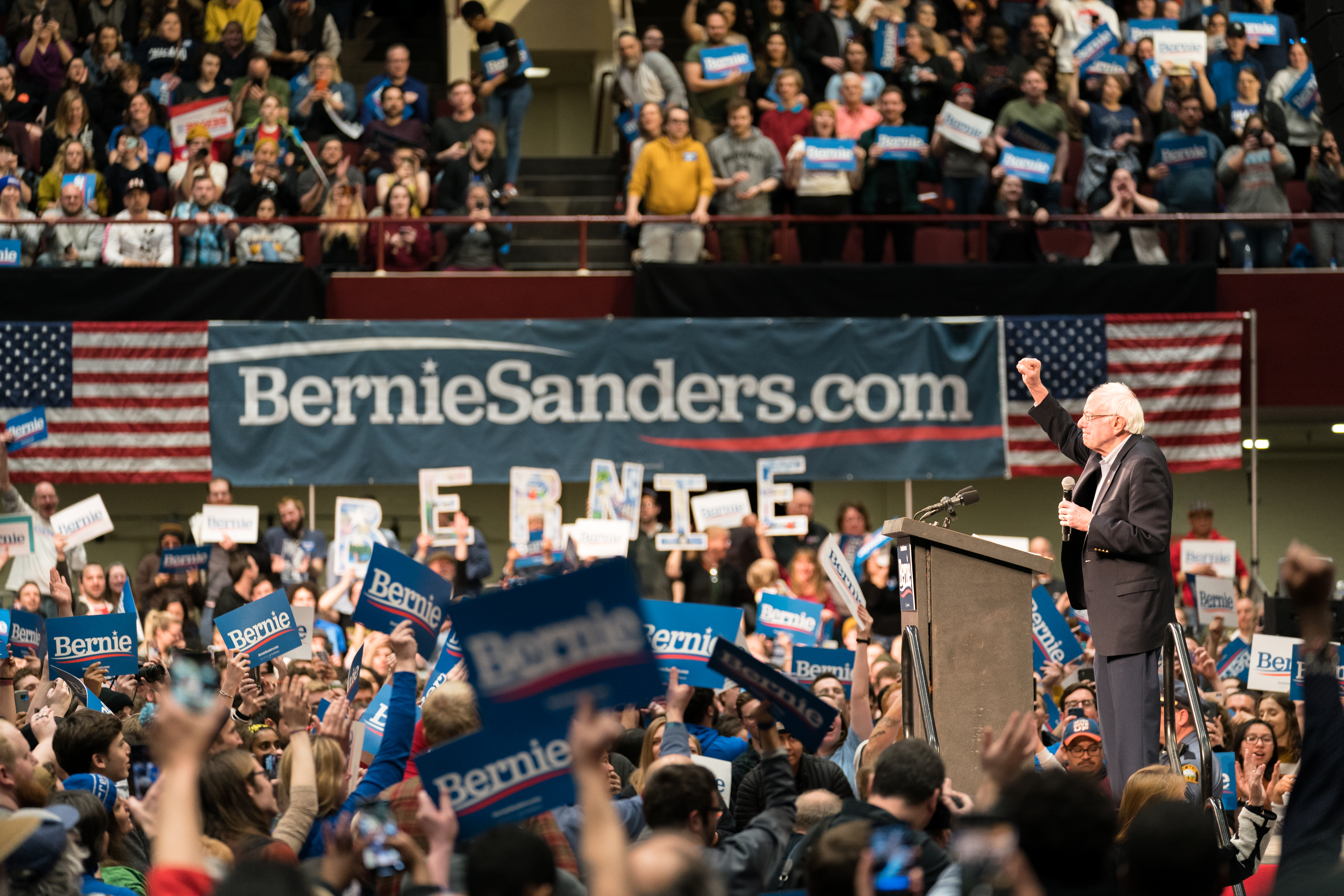
Sanders at a rally in Saint Paul, Minnesota on March 2, 2020

Shortly before Super Tuesday, Biden won the South Carolina primary, a victory that was largely attributed to Rep. Jim Clyburn's (D-SC) endorsement of him. Biden also received multiple key endorsements of former 2020 Democratic primary competitors, adding to his momentum. Following Biden attaining the lead in the election during the Super Tuesday primaries, Sanders said he would drop out if Biden ended up having more pledged delegates than him by the time of the 2020 Democratic National Convention in July, eliminating the need for superdelegate intervention in the event of a contested convention.

One week after Super Tuesday, the Michigan primary, which in 2016 gave the Sanders campaign a critical boost, was a decisive victory for Biden. The North Dakota primary was the sole victory for Sanders during the week after Super Tuesday. On March 14, Sanders won the Northern Mariana Islands caucuses, a minor contest awarding him 4 delegates.

The day after the March 17 primaries, in which Biden won all three states by wide margins, Sanders said his team was "assessing the state of our campaign" but that it would not be ending. The campaign later deactivated its Facebook advertisements. Aides to both his and Biden's campaign said they were in contact with one another regarding the coronavirus pandemic, which caused many of the upcoming primaries to be postponed.

=== Suspension ===
After poor results in election contests from Super Tuesday and beyond, Sanders announced the suspension of his 2020 presidential campaign in a call to staff and supporters on April 8. The suspension of his campaign came after failing to expand his base past his 2016 campaign that was against Hillary Clinton for the 2016 Democratic nomination. He stated that he would remain on the ballot in the remaining states and continue to accumulate delegates with the goal of influencing the Democratic Party's platform.

== Presidential debates ==
Sanders participated in all eleven Democratic debates of the primary season; only he and Joe Biden have done so. The first debate was split into two parts, with 10 candidates debating on June 26 and 10 other candidates debating on June 27; a random drawing placed Sanders in the latter group of candidates. Along with Kamala Harris, Sanders was one of two candidates to raise their hands when moderators asked for a show of hands from those who sought the abolition of private insurance as part of an effort to achieve universal coverage. Gregory Krieg of CNN observed, "Generations of Democrats of have toyed with ideas for expanding or guaranteeing coverage. But it is Sanders's relentless push for Medicare for All – a proposal with 14 Senate co-sponsors in its latest iteration – that has set a measuring stick among Democrats in this primary."

The second debates of the primary took place on July 30 and 31 in Detroit, with Sanders participating on the first night. When Tim Ryan objected to Sanders knowing for sure that his Medicare for All proposal was comprehensive, Sanders replied, "I do know it. I wrote the damn bill!" Matt Flegenheimer of The New York Times wrote that through his dismissal of Ryan "and other exchanges like it—with several candidates nipping at him and a team of CNN moderators goading the contenders into open conflict—Mr. Sanders made this much clear: For better or worse for the party, he can still own the Democratic debate. And, on this night, the Democratic debate stage." The phrase "I wrote the damn bill!" gained a life of its own, being repeated by Bernie in campaign events and later debates, and even being used in the title of Jeopardy! categories.

Sanders took part in the October 15 debate, his first appearance since he was hospitalized on October 1 when he was diagnosed as having had a myocardial infarction (heart attack). Todd Graham, a nationally recognized debate coach, gave Sanders an "A" for his performance, his highest rating of all of the candidates. He praised Sanders' comeback to Biden saying he was the only candidate that had done anything important. Sanders replied, "You got the disastrous war in Iraq done. You got a bankruptcy bill, which is hurting middle-class families all over this country. You got trade agreements, like NAFTA (The North American Free Trade Agreement) and PNTR (Permanent Normal Trade Relations), with China done, which have cost us 4 million jobs." Both Biden and Elizabeth Warren received a rating of "C" from Graham.

The first debate that featured Sanders as a nationally recognized front-runner was the February 19 debate in Paradise, Nevada. This debate also featured former New York City mayor Michael Bloomberg for the first time since his late entrance to the race in November 2019.

Sanders participated in the March 15 debate against Joe Biden on CNN. This was the first one-on-one debate of the primary season, as most other candidates had dropped out or did not meet the qualifications for the debate.

On the possibility of future debates, Sanders told Anderson Cooper on March 25, "I think we need a good debate as to where we go, not only just now but in the future. And to my mind, if there's anything that this unexpected moment in American history should teach us, we've got to rethink the basic structures of American society, and that is guaranteed health care to all as a human right, creating an economy that provides for all people not just the wealthy."

== Political positions ==
Sanders is a democratic socialist, progressive and pro-labor rights advocate who emphasizes reversing economic inequality to limit the power of the wealthy so there is "democratic socialism for working families, not just Wall Street, billionaires and large corporations." He advocates for universal and single-payer healthcare, paid parental leave, as well as tuition-free tertiary education. Sanders views global warming as a serious problem, and he brought the need for aggressive climate action to national attention in his 2016 run. In 2019 he announced support for Green New Deal legislation. On foreign policy, Sanders broadly supports reducing military spending, pursuing more diplomacy and international cooperation, and putting greater emphasis on labor rights and environmental concerns when negotiating international trade agreements. On social issues, he stands for immigration reform, abortion rights for women, opposition to the death penalty, LGBT equality, and recognition of Black Lives Matter concerns.

== Endorsements ==
Major current or former American politicians who endorsed Sanders include Patrick Leahy, Jesús "Chuy" García, Pramila Jayapal, Ro Khanna, Keith Ellison, Peter Welch, Alexandria Ocasio-Cortez, Ilhan Omar, Rashida Tlaib, Robert Reich, Bill de Blasio, Mark Pocan and Mike Gravel. This stood in stark contrast with 2016, when Sanders had little to no support from prominent political figures. Political organizations including Brand New Congress and Our Revolution have also endorsed his candidacy. In January 2020, the Sunrise Movement endorsed Sanders for president.

International heads of state including Daniel Ortega, Evo Morales, Luiz Inácio Lula da Silva, and Rafael Correa had also endorsed Sanders.

Notable individuals who had endorsed Sanders include Jack Nicholson, Emily Ratajkowski, Danny DeVito, Danny Glover, Dick Van Dyke, Cardi B, Lil Yachty, Miley Cyrus, Hailey Bieber, Dave Bautista, Chloë Sevigny, Killer Mike, Shailene Woodley, Shaun King, Linda Sarsour, Susan Sarandon, John Mulaney, Rob Delaney, Milla Jovovich, Michael Moore, Cynthia Nixon, John Cusack, Sarah Silverman, Werner Herzog, Ethan and Hila Klein, Magdalene Visaggio, Vincent Waller, Owen Dennis, Justin Long, Elizabeth Gillies, Thomas Middleditch, Lizzo, Caroline Calloway, David Cross, Charlyne Yi, Bill Sienkiewicz, Julian Casablancas, Norah Jones, Tim Heidecker, Willow Smith, Susan Eisenberg, William Salyers, Sandy Fox, Jack White, Jason Mraz, Brandi Carlile, Billy West, Rebecca Sugar, Mark Ruffalo, TJ Kirk, Boogie2988, Greg Cipes, Amer Zahr, Eric Andre, Ariana Grande, Bon Iver's Justin Vernon, Neil Young, and Cenk Uygur. Joe Rogan is said to have endorsed him due to his saying on his podcast that he would probably vote for Bernie, but has since cast some doubt about whether this was an endorsement.

In July 2019, the Sanders campaign issued an "anti-endorsement" list consisting almost entirely of corporate executives and billionaires who have criticized the senator and his policies.

In February 2020, The New York Times reported that two members of the South Carolina legislature who endorsed Sanders owned small consulting firms that received tens of thousands of dollars as "vendors" to the Sanders campaign; the arrangement has raised ethical concerns. On February 23, 2020, the day after Sanders' victory in the Nevada caucuses, former presidential candidate Marianne Williamson endorsed Sanders.

On March 9, 2020, Working Families Party endorsed Sanders for President, following former presidential candidate Elizabeth Warren's withdrawal.

== See also ==
- Bernie Sanders 2016 presidential campaign
- Media coverage of Bernie Sanders
- Our Revolution
