= Netroots Nation =

American progressive political convention

- Formation: 2004
- Executive Director: Anthony Robinson
- Website: netrootsnation.org

Netroots Nation is a political convention for American progressive political activists. Originally organized by readers and writers of Daily Kos, a liberal political blog, it was originally called YearlyKos and rebranded as Net roots Nation in 2007. The new name was chosen to reflect the participation of a broader audience of grassroots activists, campaign workers and volunteers, messaging technology innovators as well as local, state, and national elected officials. The convention offers three days of programming: panel discussions on emerging issues in politics and society; training sessions to support more effective activism; keynote addresses from speakers of national stature; an exhibit hall; networking and social events. The event draws roughly 3000 attendees.

== Conferences by year ==
=== Summary ===
Year	City, State	Venue	Dates
2006	Las Vegas Valley, Nevada	Riviera Hotel and Casino	June 8–11
2007	Chicago, Illinois	McCormick Place	August 2–5
2008	Austin, Texas	Austin Convention Center	July 17–20
2009	Pittsburgh, Pennsylvania	David L. Lawrence Convention Center	August 13–16
2010	Paradise (Las Vegas Valley), Nevada	Rio All Suite Hotel and Casino	
2011	Minneapolis, Minnesota		June 16–19
2012	Providence, Rhode Island	Rhode Island Convention Center	June 7–10
2013	San Jose, California		June 20–23
2014	Detroit, Michigan	Cobo Center	July 17–21
2015	Phoenix, Arizona		July
2016	St. Louis, Missouri		July 14–17
2017	Atlanta, Georgia	Hyatt Regency Atlanta	August 10–13
2018	New Orleans, Louisiana		August 2–3
2019	Philadelphia, Pennsylvania	Pennsylvania Convention Center	July 11–13
2020	virtual due to COVID-19 pandemic		August 13–15
2021	virtual due to COVID-19 pandemic		October 7–9
2022	Pittsburgh, Pennsylvania		August 18–20
2023	Chicago, Illinois	Hilton Chicago	July 13–15
2024	Baltimore, Maryland	Baltimore Convention Center	July 11–13
2025	New Orleans, Louisiana	Ernest N. Morial Convention Center	August 7–9
2026	Philadelphia, Pennsylvania		

=== 2006 ===
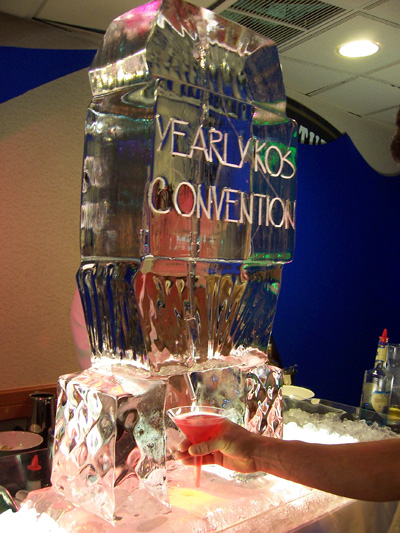
Ice sculpture at the first convention in Las Vegas

The first YearlyKos was held in Las Vegas from June 8–11, 2006. It was held at the Riviera Hotel and Casino. There were 1,200 attendees and it featured prominent Democrats including Harry Reid, Howard Dean, and Barbara Boxer, as well as three possible contenders in the 2008 Democratic primary: retired General Wesley Clark, New Mexico governor Bill Richardson, and former Virginia governor Mark Warner.

The convention hosted panels, roundtable discussion groups, and other gatherings of activists, media representatives and elected officials. Democracy for America and the Center for American Progress were among the groups offering training sessions. Many of the panels were broadcast on C-SPAN. The convention received a significant amount of coverage in traditional media, including a write-up in the New York Times which said that the event "seems on its way to becoming as much a part of the Democratic political circuit as the Iowa State Fair."

Gina Cooper was the founder and first director of YearlyKos, later to be Netroots Nation.

=== 2007 ===
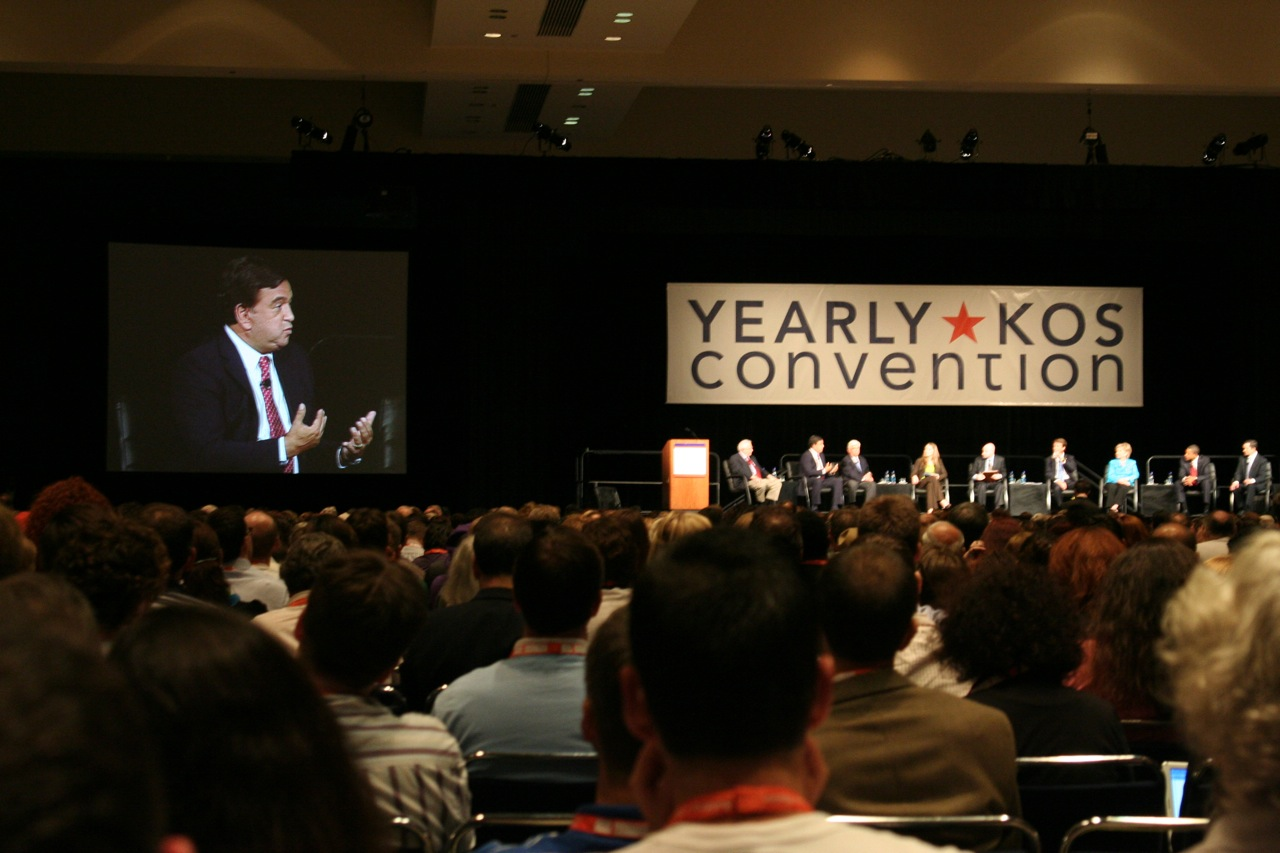
Debate at the 2007 conference

The 2007 YearlyKos was held at the McCormick Place Convention Center in Chicago from August 2–5. Seven of the eight major 2008 Democratic Party presidential candidates attended the convention and participated in a forum moderated by bloggers. The candidates were Hillary Clinton, Chris Dodd, John Edwards, Mike Gravel, Dennis Kucinich, Barack Obama, and Bill Richardson. Notably at this event Hillary Clinton refused to join John Edwards and Barack Obama in a pledge to stop taking money from Washington lobbyists.

Before and after the debate the candidates held individual break-out sessions. Media coverage called out the emergence of the Netroots in political discourse ("Liberal bloggers can count the ways they are making their presence felt in the presidential race." –Chicago Tribune) and predicted its influence beyond 2008 ("The Netroots appear to be here to stay. Much of the debate at this year's conference is aimed not at defining who the group is but rather at on what the group should do in 2008 and beyond." – Chris Cillizza, Washington Post).

House Speaker Nancy Pelosi and Senate Majority Leader Harry Reid were expected to appear, but were held up in Washington due to various votes. On Saturday night of the convention, the U.S. House of Representatives passed the controversial Foreign Intelligence Surveillance Act (FISA) legislation to expand George W. Bush's surveillance powers.

=== 2008 ===
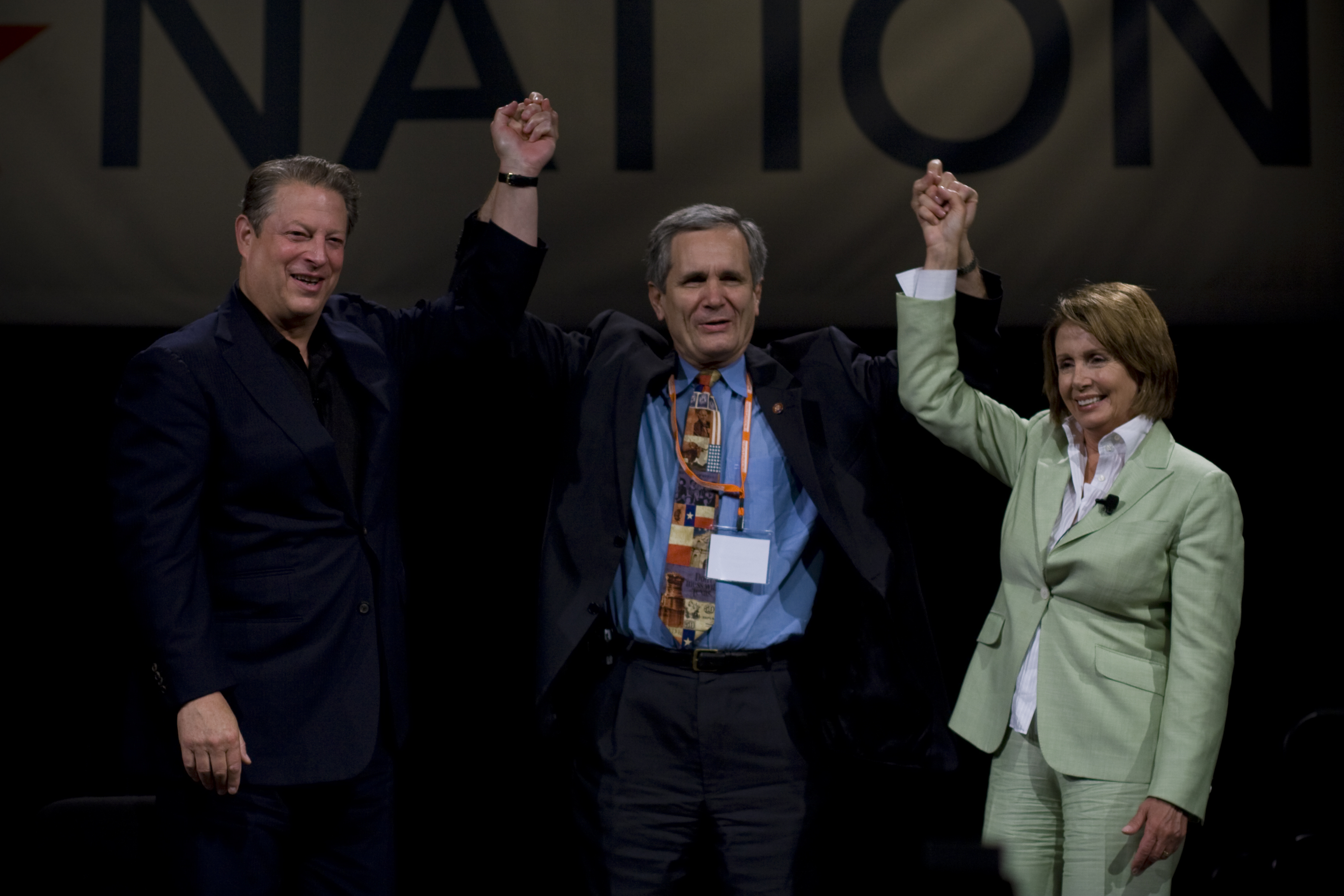
Al Gore, Lloyd Doggett, and Nancy Pelosi at the 2008 convention

After rebranding to Netroots Nation to reflect the growing influence and membership of the Netroots as a community of interest beyond Daily Kos' readership, the 2008 convention was held in Austin, Texas, at the Austin Convention Center on July 17–20. Prominent speakers in 2008 included Speaker of the House Nancy Pelosi, who was joined on stage by a surprise guest, former Vice President Al Gore, who discussed his new film An Inconvenient Truth about the devastating effects of climate change.

Other prominent speakers in attendance were Gov. Howard Dean, Harold Ford Jr., Lawrence Lessig, Rep. Donna Edwards and Van Jones. On Saturday night, Gina Cooper announced the end of her tenure as director of Netroots Nation.

=== 2009 ===
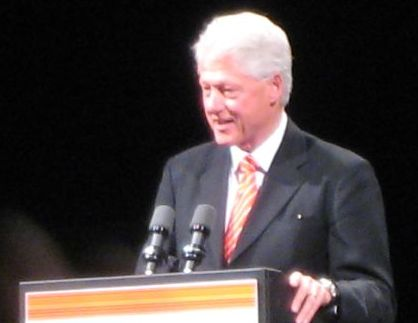
Bill Clinton speaking at the 2009 convention

In 2009, Netroots Nation was held at Pittsburgh's David L. Lawrence Convention Center on August 13–16. Pittsburgh was chosen in part because it is a leader in LEED Certified green building technology, with more square footage of green buildings than any other city in the country. Another reason was Pittsburgh's rich labor union history. Prominent speakers included President Bill Clinton, Valerie Jarrett, former Vermont Gov. Howard Dean, SEIU's Anna Burger, former New Jersey Governor Jon Corzine, and Dean Baker, an economist. There was also a debate between Pennsylvania Senate candidates Rep. Joe Sestak and Sen. Arlen Specter.

The keynote speaker was former US President Bill Clinton. The event captured international headlines when the Democratic Congressional leadership seemingly abandoned the "public option" during the Health Care debate and Howard Dean spoke forcefully that the party would reconsider this issue and not compromise on it. Bill Clinton also made headlines in Pittsburgh when responding to a question shouted at him during his speech, concerning gay rights and the military. Clinton quipped at a shouting audience member, "You know you should go to one of those Congressional health care meetings," and went on to say that the implementation of the policy was not what he envisioned or how it was originally defined and that it was ridiculous that $150,000 was spent "to get rid of an Arabic translator" and that 130 servicemen and -women known to be gay were allowed to serve in the first Gulf War until "they kicked them out."

=== 2010 ===
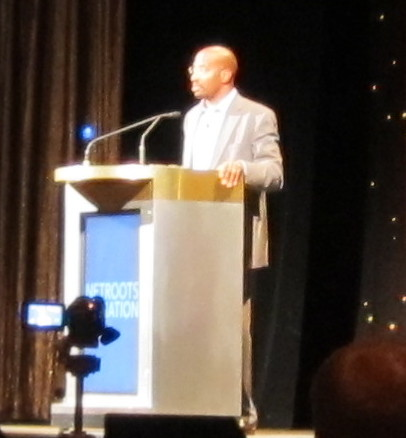
Van Jones speaking at the 2010 convention

The 2010 Netroots Nation conference was held in the Las Vegas Valley at the Rio All Suite Hotel and Casino in Paradise, Nevada. About 2,200 activists attended the conference. More than 200 national and international media covered the conference including CNN, Univision, AP, Politico and others.

The conference featured 70 panels, a screening series, and a Campaign Academy with 30 hands-on training sessions. The sessions organized with the help of Democracy for America, featured professionals from dozens of organizations and publications in the progressive movement. Along with the panels and trainings, there were seven keynote sessions. Two of the keynotes were question-and-answer sessions: Ask the Speaker with House Speaker Nancy Pelosi and Ask the Leader with Senate Majority Leader Harry Reid. Former Lt. Dan Choi, discharged for serving as openly gay in the military, challenged Senator Reid to repeal Don't Ask, Don't Tell.

Prominent speakers included Speaker Nancy Pelosi, Majority Leader Harry Reid, Sen. Al Franken, Elizabeth Warren, Gov. Brian Schweitzer, Ed Schultz, Sen. Jeff Merkley, Sen. Ben Cardin, Sen. Tom Udall, Rep. Alan Grayson, Rep. Raul Grijalva, Rep. Jared Polis, Rep. Donna Edwards, Rep. Jerrold Nadler, Van Jones, Rich Trumka, Tim Wise, Lizz Winstead, Majora Carter, Markos Moulitsas, Tarryl Clark, Bill Halter, Phaedra Ellis-Lamkins, Gerald McEntee, and Eliseo Medina. During his speech, Sen. Franken (D-MN) argued against media consolidation and for net neutrality laws. He said in part, "If we don't protect Net Neutrality now, how long do you think it will take before Comcast-NBC Universal, or Verizon-CBS Viacom or AT&T-ABC-DirecTV or BP-Haliburton-Walmart-Fox-Domino's-Pizza start favoring its content over everyone else's?"

=== 2011 ===
The 2011 Netroots Nation was held June 16–19 in Minneapolis, Minnesota, and drew 2,400 people. Prominent featured speakers included Rep. Debbie Wasserman-Schultz, former Senator Russ Feingold, Minneapolis mayor R. T. Rybak, Vermont governor Howard Dean, Van Jones, White House Communications Director Daniel Pfeiffer, John Aravosis, Shannon Augare, Senator Mark Begich, Senator Ben Cardin, Rep. Judy Chu, Lt. Dan Choi, Rep. Keith Ellison, Tarryl Clark, Dr. Heidi Cullen, Rep. Donna Edwards, Maj. Gen. Paul Eaton, Laura Flanders, Sen. Al Franken, Rep. John Garamendi, Rep. Luis Gutierrez, Jane Hamsher, and Montana State Rep. Ellie Hill.

Netroots Nation 2011 had an international presence with bloggers and activists from 24 countries including Germany, Morocco, Yemen, Iran, Kyrgyzstan, Afghanistan and China participating. The conference culminated in the first ever Freedom from Fear Awards program, which highlighted immigration activism and featured an original song from Jill Sobule, They Say They Want Our America Back.

=== 2012 ===
Netroots Nation 2012 was held June 7–10 in Providence, Rhode Island, at the Rhode Island Convention Center. Prominent featured speakers included Rebuild the Dream co-founder Van Jones, NAACP President Benjamin Jealous, Congressman David Cicilline (RI-01), winner of the Nobel Prize for Economics and New York Times op-ed columnist Paul Krugman, Carol Shea-Porter, AFL-CIO's Rich Trumka, AFT President Randi Weingarten, soon-to-be elected senators Elizabeth Warren, Mazie Hirono, and Tammy Baldwin, Ai-jen Poo-National Domestic Workers Alliance director, and Rhode Island State Representatives Teresa Tanzi and Chuck Rocha.

=== 2013 ===
Netroots Nation 2013 was held June 20–23 in San Jose, California, and was attended by about 3,000 activists, its largest crowd ever. Jeff Merkley gave the opening keynote speech. On June 22, Nancy Pelosi participated in a Q&A session and was booed by the audience for saying that Edward Snowden had broken the law by revealing information about the NSA's surveillance programs and she defended Barack Obama on the topic.

=== 2014 ===
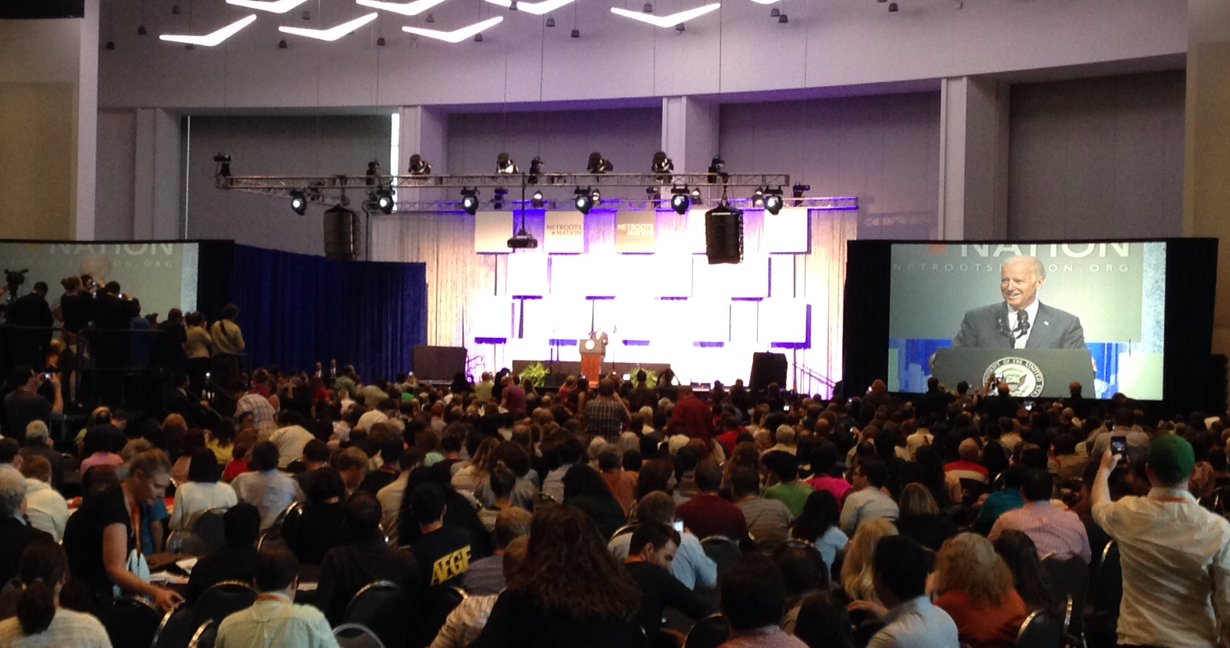
Audience listens to Joe Biden speaking at the 2014 convention.

Netroots Nation 2014 was held at Cobo Center in Detroit on July 17–21, 2014. Vice-President Joe Biden delivered the opening keynote on Thursday afternoon, touching on topics including marriage equality, compassion for immigrants, and expanded voting access. He said the country has reached an inflection point and that progressives have a chance to bend the arc of history. Rev. Dr. William Barber II spoke Thursday evening, urging attendees to come together as allies. "We must resist the moment mentality," Barber said. "We are not here for a moment. We must be here to build a movement."

On Friday, Senator Elizabeth Warren addressed the crowd, calling for tougher regulations and oversight of Wall Street and ensuring that blue-collar families can earn a livable wage and retire with a social safety net.

Actor Mark Ruffalo was at the convention, since he was in Detroit for the "Turn on the Water" march and rally, organized after the Detroit Water and Sewerage Department stopped water service for more than 15,000 households in the city that had not paid their water bill. On Saturday, attendees chose their favorite app, product or technology at the Netroots Nation New Tools Shootout event. Action Network won for best overall technology and best startup technology. The Sunlight Foundation's OpenCongress won best new feature or product, and Organizer won for best mobile or Facebook app.

=== 2015 ===
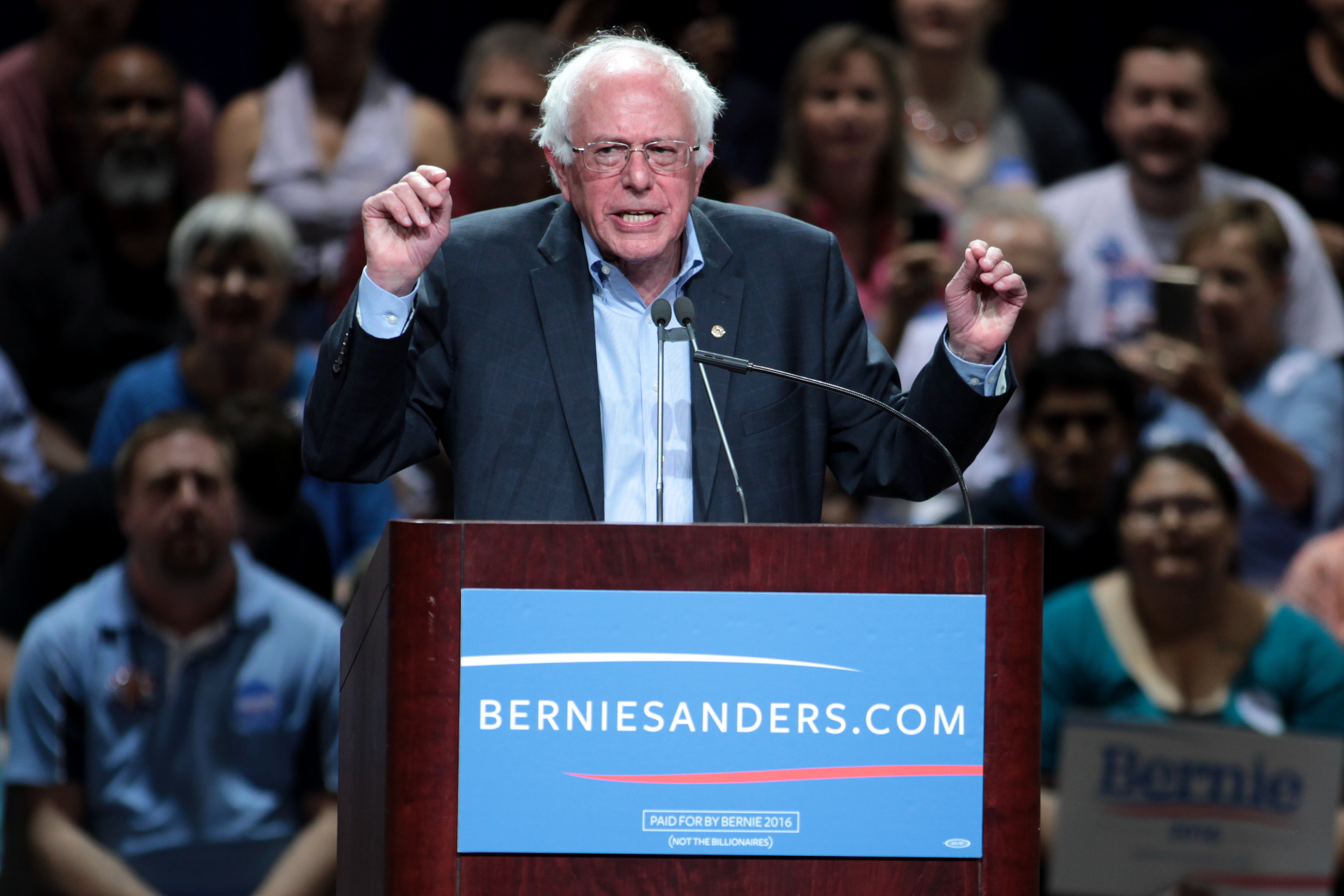
Bernie Sanders addresses his supporters at a 2015 rally, not connected to the convention.

The Netroots Nation 2015 conference was scheduled for mid-summer July 16 in Phoenix. The 2015 convention was one of the most diverse events to date. A majority of panelists were people of color (62%) and women (63%). This also was a year where the focus of convention was Latinx and immigration issues. A record 280 scholarships for DREAMers and organizers of color were distributed, helping them gain access to activist trainings throughout the event. The Netroots community also participated in a large demonstration against Arizona Sheriff Joe Arpaio.

Representative Donna Edwards was the opening keynote speaker. Senator Elizabeth Warren was also among those that gave keynote addresses.

On July 18, 2015, former Maryland Governor Martin O'Malley was interrupted while answering questions at the conference by protestors associated with the Black Lives Matter movement. Black Alliance for Just Immigration staffer and Coordinator of the Black Immigration Network Tia Oso took the stage with O'Malley as the protest group chanted "Black Lives Matter" and "Say Her Name" while calling out the names of black women killed in police custody. Pressed to address his position on the Black Lives Matter movement, O'Malley stated, "Black lives matter, White lives matter, All lives matter," drawing boos from the crowd.

=== 2016 ===
Netroots Nation was held in St. Louis, Missouri, from July 14–17, 2016. The Convention commenced with a keynote hosted by This Week In Blackness with hosts Elon James White, L. Joy Williams, and Sonya Renee Taylor interviewed many notable activists including Jamala Rogers of Organization for Black Struggle; Rika Tyler of Hands Up United; Elle Hearns of Black Lives Matter; Rev. Sekou, pastor, author, theologian and fellow at the Martin Luther King Institute at Stanford University; Tef Poe, hip hop artist and co-leader of Hands Up United, CeCe McDonald, Brittany Ferrell, and Alexis Templeton of Millennial Activists United.

Friday's keynote included discussion about the intersection of climate change and environmental justice. The speakers were Tom Steyer, president of NextGen Climate; Jacqui Patterson, director of the NAACP's Environmental and Climate Justice Program; Michelle Romero of Green for All; and Anthony Rogers-Wright, policy and organizing director for Environmental Action. Friday featured a plenary roundtable discussion on digital culture shifting and increasing racial justice. Speakers included leaders on the frontlines of the 21st century movement for racial justice and civil rights: Color of Change's Rashad Robinson, Linda Sarsour of MPower, Autumn Marie of Black Lives Matter, Malkia Cyril of the Center for Media Justice, and Joe Torres of Free Press. The session was moderated by Samhita Mukhopadhyay of the media organization Mic.

Saturday's morning keynote included discussions on the state of abortion access and reproductive justice: speakers Lizz Winstead of Lady Parts Justice, Pamela Merritt of ReproAction, Laura Jimenez of California Leaders for Reproductive Justice, Aimee Thorne-Thomsen of the activist organization SisterSong, and Representative Jan Schakowsky.

The closing keynote on Saturday included speakers Representative Keith Ellison and New York Times bestselling author Steve Phillips, who spoke about the importance of fighting together for equality and progress (and against Donald Trump). Attendees also heard from Equality Florida's Carlos Guillermo Smith, who shared stories and experiences from his hometown of Orlando. Joseph Geevarghese and Brittany Butler from Good Jobs Nation discussed ways American workers can stand up for their economic values. In a video message, Hillary Clinton proposed an amendment to the United States Constitution to reverse the Citizens United v. FEC Supreme Court decision, as well as call for more funding to deal with implicit bias. angel Kyodo williams closed out the 2016 convention with an uplifting meditation.

=== 2017 ===
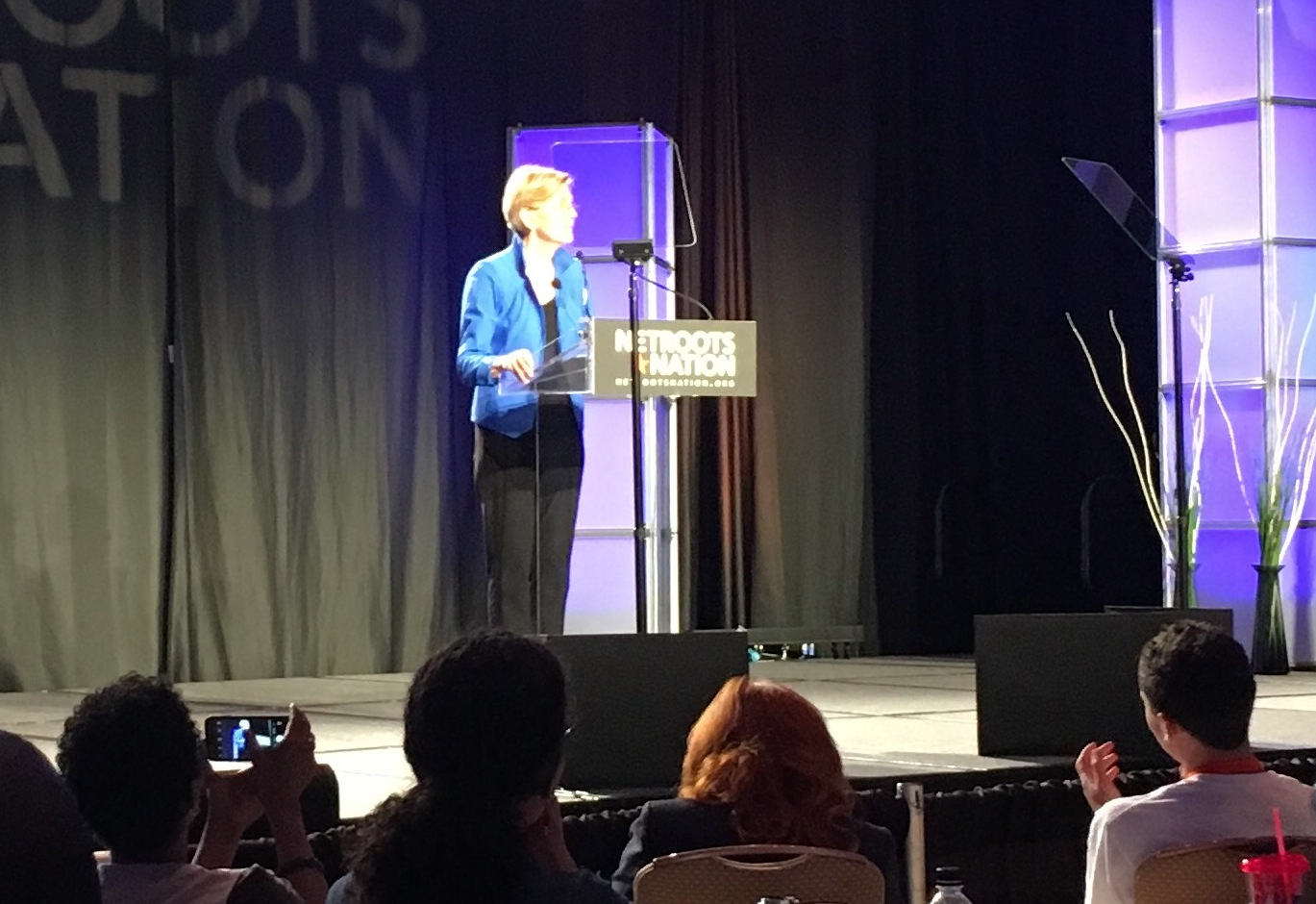
Elizabeth Warren at the 2017 convention

The 2017 Netroots Nation was held on August 10–13, 2017, in Atlanta at the Hyatt Regency Atlanta. The convention was the most diverse event to date, with 69 percent of selected speakers and moderators being people of color.

The opening keynote featured the New Georgia Project's Nse Ufot, Jason Kander, Joe Sanberg, Mustafa Ali, then-Florida gubernatorial candidate Andrew Gillum, former Rep. Donna Edwards, then-Georgia gubernatorial candidate Stacey Abrams, and Rep. Barbara Lee. On Friday, plenary speakers included West Virginia activist Paula Jean Swearengen, former Congressional candidate Randy Bryce, Rep. Ruben Gallego, Kimberlé Crenshaw, and Janine Jackson.

Ezra Levin and Leah Greenberg founders of the Indivisible movement participated in multiple panels at this convention.

Panels featured activists from across the country, members of Congress, top digital practitioners, and those at the forefront of the latest Resistance efforts. On Saturday, Senator Elizabeth Warren addressed the crowd, as did MD Gubernatorial candidate Ben Jealous. At the closing keynote, Mustafa Ali interviewed Former Vice President Al Gore on climate justice issues and the recent release of the sequel to An Inconvenient Truth, called An Inconvenient Sequel.

As the conference ended, many participants, led by labor organizer Dolores Huerta and others, marched to the State Capitol Building in protest over the right-wing violence in Charlottesville, Virginia earlier that day, which resulted in the death of Heather Heyer.

=== 2018 ===
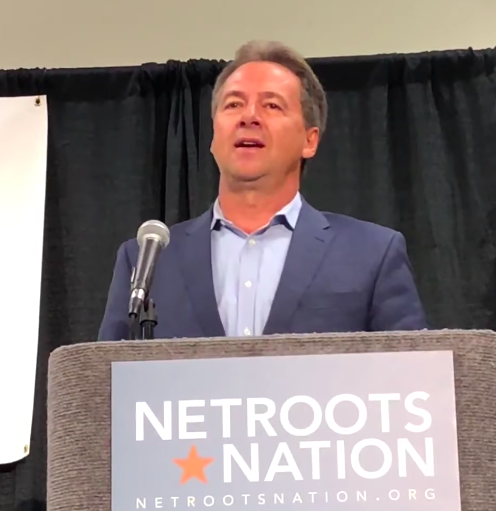
Steve Bullock speaking at Netroots Nation 2018

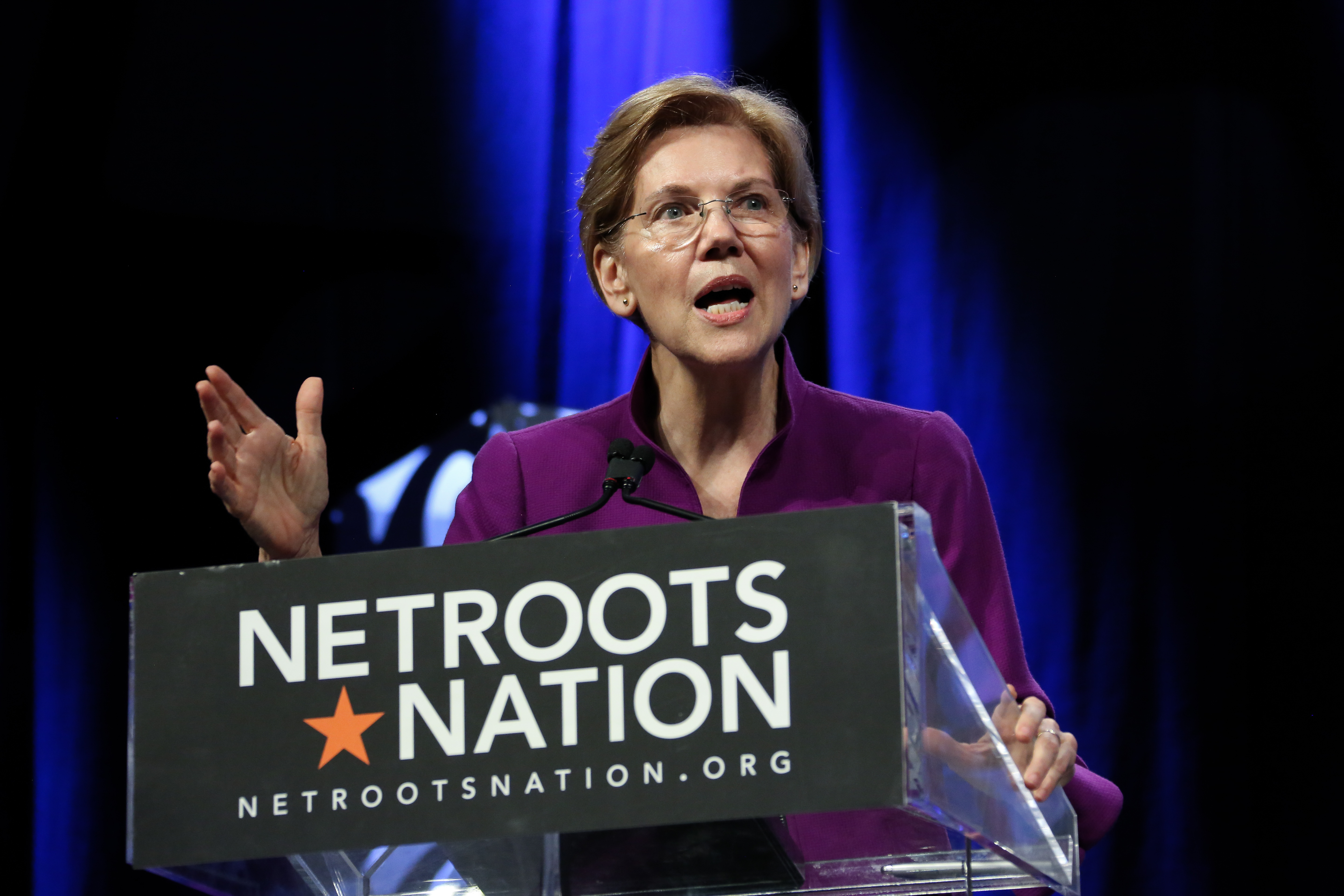
Elizabeth Warren giving her keynote at Netroots Nation 2018

Netroots Nation 2018 was held August 2–4 in New Orleans; the attendance was estimated at 3,000. The opening keynote featured New Orleans Mayor LaToya Cantrell and candidate Gina Ortiz Jones. Colette Pichon Battle of the Gulf Coast Center for Law & Policy spoke about grassroots organizing, and Jackson, Mississippi Mayor Chokwe Antar Lumumba challenged the audience to dismantle structural disenfranchisement.

There was a featured panel discussion (titled "Hidden Figures") led by women of color strategists about how they are organizing in critical states for 2018. Sens. Elizabeth Warren, Cory Booker and Kamala Harris delivered keynote addresses on Friday.

Among Friday's featured panels was "Race-Class: How to Build a Truly Multi-racial Movement for Racial Justice and Shared Prosperity for all." At Saturday's closing keynote, Idaho gubernatorial candidate Paulette Jordan, and New York gubernatorial candidate Cynthia Nixon addressed the crowd. Congressional candidate Alexandria Ocasio-Cortez called for social, economic and racial justice for all working class Americans. Former U.S. Secretary of Housing and Urban Development Julian Castro challenged progressives to reach, register and mobilize the strong majority of Americans who want change now.

=== 2019 ===
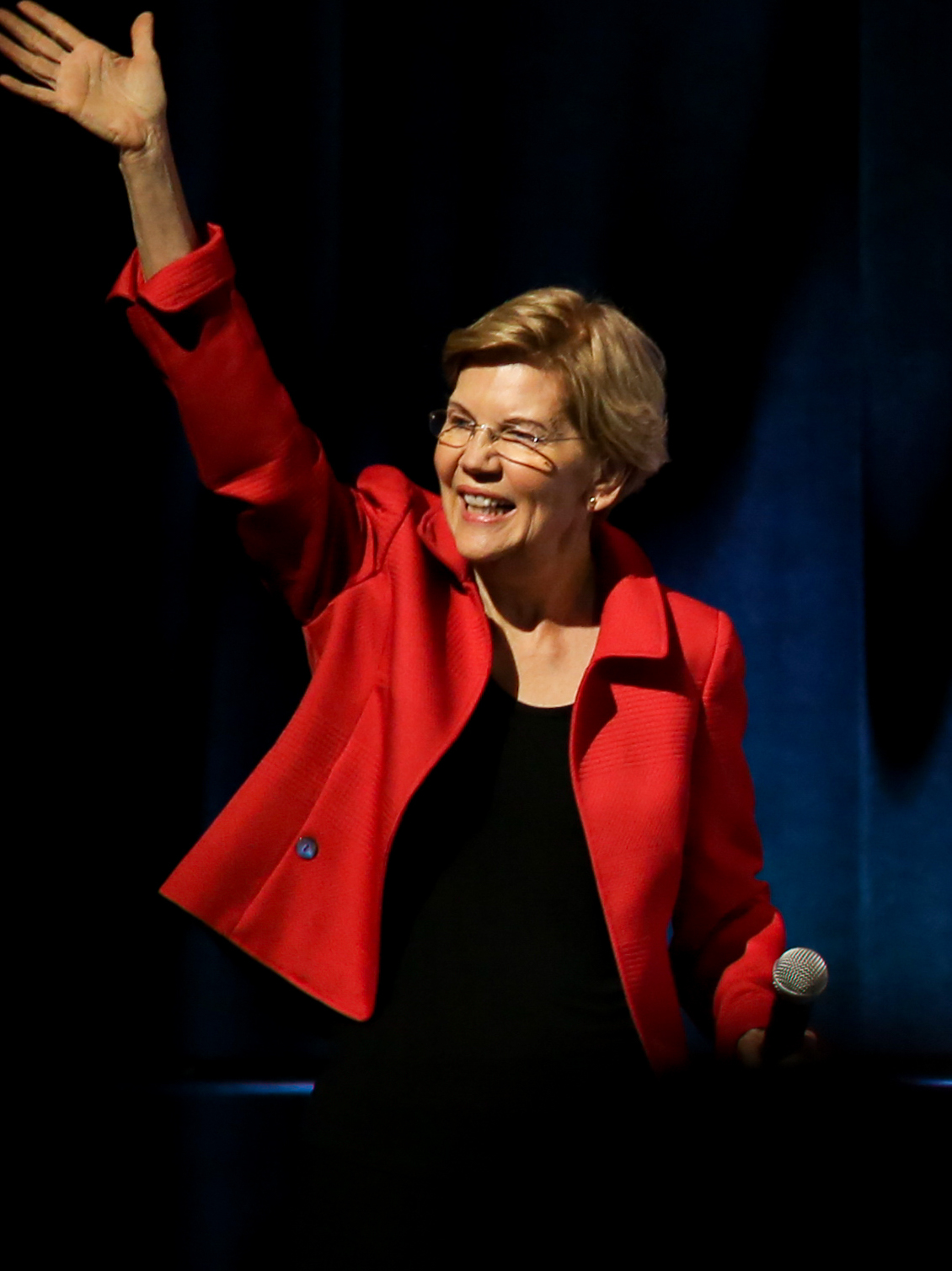
Elizabeth Warren at Netroots Nation 2019

Netroots Nation 2019 was held July 11–13 in Philadelphia at the Pennsylvania Convention Center. The estimated attendance was 3,600.

Democratic Party Presidential candidates Julián Castro, Kirsten Gillibrand, Jay Inslee, and Elizabeth Warren were in attendance. Notably, candidate Bernie Sanders did not personally attend, but he was represented by others from his 2020 campaign, including national co-chair Nina Turner. Also in attendance were Ilhan Omar, Ayanna Pressley, and Rashida Tlaib. They are three of four members of the informal group of freshman U.S. Representatives which includes Alexandria Ocasio-Cortez, known as "The Squad", who are all progressive women of color.

The start of the convention took place in the midst of protests, a block away, at 171-year-old Hahnemann University Hospital. The protests were in resistance to the closure of the hospital, by a private equity firm which purchased it 21 months earlier. The hospital provides vital medical and emergency room services, and employs approximately 2500 mostly union workers. The closure would affect mainly poor, black, and Latinx residents. Sanders went to Philadelphia to attend a Hahnemann protest on July 15.

=== 2020 ===
Netroots Nation 2020 was held August 13–15 in an all-online, virtual format due to the COVID-19 pandemic, with approximately 2,500 participants registered. Speakers included Sen. Elizabeth Warren, Rep. Barbara Lee, Rep. Pramila Jayapal, Rep. Deb Haaland, Rep. Katie Porter, Rep. Ayanna Pressley, Rep. Ilhan Omar, Stacey Abrams, and then-candidates Mondaire Jones and Jamaal Bowman.

=== 2021 ===
Netroots Nation 2021 was originally planned to be held in a hybrid format, October 7-9: both in-person in Washington D.C. and online (similar to 2020). However in early September 2021 the conference organizers decided that due to the ongoing pandemic, the conference would be shifted to an all-online format (on the same dates as originally planned). The event featured more than 120+ hours of content including over 50 training sessions and 70 panels. More than 2,000 attendees participated virtually.

Speakers included Secretary of Energy Jennifer Granholm, White House National Climate Advisor Gina McCarthy, Sen. Tina Smith, Reps. Raul Grijalva, Mondaire Jones, Barbara Lee, Ted Lieu, Joe Neguse, Katie Porter, Rashida Tlaib, DNC Chair Jaime Harrison, WI Lt. Gov. Governor Mandela Barnes, Sec. Shenna Bellows of Maine, Sec. Jocelyn Benson of Michigan, Sec. Jena Griswold of Colorado, Sec. Denise Merrill of Connecticut, and Attorneys General Keith Ellison, Maura Healey, Dana Nessel, and Josh Stein.

=== 2022 ===
Netroots Nation returned to an in-person gathering in 2022, with its 17th annual conference taking place August 18–20 in Pittsburgh. About 2,500 people attended the event which featured more than 140 panels, trainings and other breakout sessions. About 40 hours of content was streamed for virtual participants.

Speakers included Congresswoman Ilhan Omar, newly-elected Congresswoman Summer Lee, Abigail Disney, LaTosha Brown of Black Voters Matter, AFA President Sara Nelson, AFT President Randi Weingarten, Pulse shooting survivor Brandon Wolfe, Daily Kos founder Markos Moulitsas, Chris Smalls of Amazon Labor Union, California Attorney General Rob Bonta, Minnesota Attorney General Keith Ellison, Connecticut Attorney General William Tong, Acting Secretary of the Commonwealth of Pennsylvania Leigh Chapman, Colorado Secretary of State Jena Griswold, Nevada Secretary of State Cisco Aguilar, Pennsylvania State Reps. Malcolm Kenyatta and Sara Innamorato, and Pennsylvania State Sen. Lindsey Williams.

More than 110 organizations including 1Hood Media, ActBlue, American Federation of Teachers, Daily Kos, Black Male Voter Project, Pacifica Strategies, Mobile Commons, Democratic National Committee, Planned Parenthood, Comcast NBCUniversal, MoveOn and more participated as sponsors or exhibitors.

=== 2023 ===
Netroots Nation 2023 was held in Chicago on July 13–15 at the Hilton Chicago. The 18th annual conference boasted 2,900 attendees from 48 states and 7 countries, more than 150 breakout sessions and nearly 450 speakers. The event featured virtual content as well. Approximately 120 organizations sponsored or exhibited at the event, including the American Federation of Teachers, ActBlue, Black Male Voter Project, CallHub, Pacifica Strategies, and Upland Mobile Commons.

Much of the content focused on efforts to organize and build power at the state and local level. The 2023 conference also featured sessions on urgent issues in America, including protecting democracy, addressing gun violence and abortion access, and more. The agenda also highlighted progressive organizing wins in Chicago from the election of Chicago Mayor Brandon Johnson to how a statewide movement passed legislation to end money bail.

Many members of Congress spoke including Reps. Pramila Jayapal, Ilhan Omar, Summer Lee, Greg Casar, Delia Ramirez, Maxwell Frost, Jan Schakowsky, Chuy García and Sean Casten. Rev. Jesse Jackson was a surprise guest for the Friday keynote. Additional speakers were Chicago Mayor Brandon Johnson, Tennessee State Rep. Justin Jones, AFT's Randi Weingarten, scholar and civil rights writer Kimberlé Crenshaw, activist and writer Tim Wise, Nina Turner, Minnesota Attorney General Keith Ellison, Illinois Attorney General Kwame Raoul, California Attorney General Rob Bonta, Michigan Lieutenant Governor Garlin Gilchrist, Nevada Secretary of State Francisco "Cisco" Aguilar, Michigan Secretary of State Jocelyn Benson, Arizona Secretary of State Adrien Fontes, Connecticut Secretary of State Stephanie Thomas, Alicia Garza, Maurice Mitchell of Working Families Party, Markos Moulitsas of Daily Kos, and more.

=== 2024 ===
Netroots Nation 2024 was held in Baltimore on July 11–13 at the Baltimore Convention Center. Featured speakers included U.S. Senator Tina Smith, New York State Attorney General Letitia James, Maryland Attorney General Anthony Brown and SEIU President April Verrett and Baltimore Mayor Brandon Scott. Many U.S. Representatives spoke including Cori Bush, Barbara Lee, Delia Ramirez, Greg Casar, Pramila Jayapal, Rashida Tlaib and Ro Khanna.

UAW President Shawn Fain, messaging consultant Anat Shenker-Osorio, educator Ash-Lee Woodard Henderson and Maryland State Senator Jill Carter also spoke. Reimagine Appalachia, World Resources Institute, Data for Progress, the Black Appalachian Coalition, and The Nature Conservancy were represented on a panel titled Building Community-First Climate Infrastructure.

=== 2025 ===
Netroots Nation 2025 was held from August 7-9 at the Ernest N. Morial Convention Center in New Orleans. Speakers included Rep. Delia Ramirez, D-IL, and former Texas Rep. Beto O’Rourke.
