= Ferguson Action =

Social movement against police violence

- Formation: 2014
- Purpose: Social justice
- Location: Ferguson, Missouri
- Region served: United States
- Website: web.archive.org/web/20190503152059/http://fergusonaction.com/

Ferguson Action (previously known as Ferguson October) was an organized social movement that uses protests and resistance to oppose police violence in the United States. The movement became notable after organizing protests that gained national attention following the shooting of Michael Brown in Ferguson, Missouri in 2014. In October 2014, the movement organized a four-day event, called the Weekend of Resistance, in which more than 1000 protestors from across the United States marched in downtown St. Louis.

== History ==
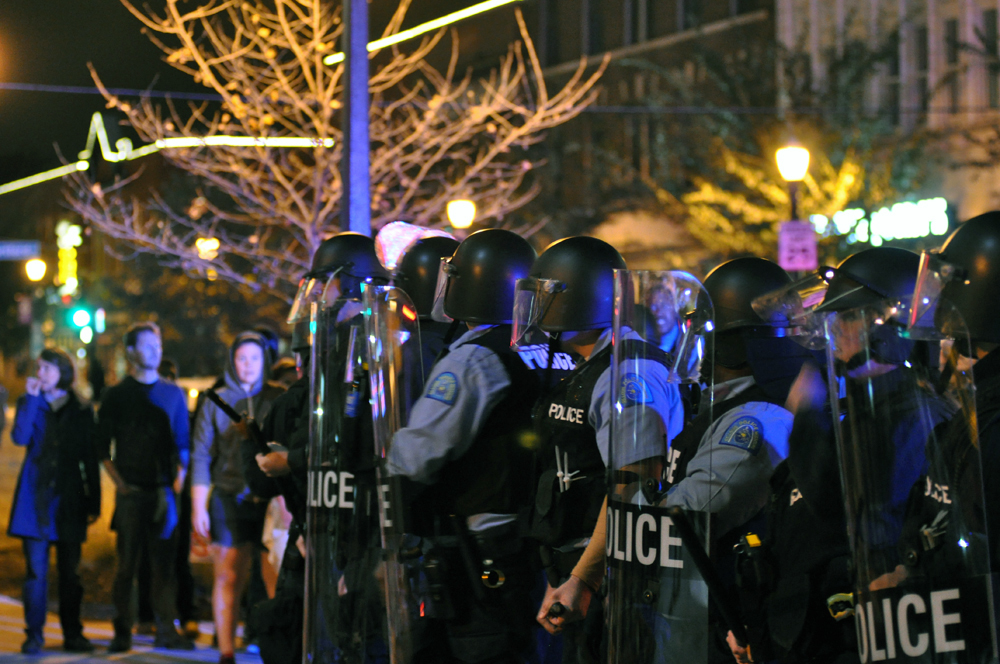
Police stand watch during protests in the neighborhood of Shaw in St. Louis, Missouri.

Ferguson October was organized by the Organization for Black Struggle, Hands Up United, Missourians Organizing for Reform and Empowerment and local activists including Tef Poe, Taurean Russell and Ashley Yates. Several other activist groups from across the United States supported the effort with rallies in their cities. One of the movement's objectives is for police officer Darren Wilson to be criminally charged for the shooting death of Michael Brown.

In November 2014, Ferguson October was relaunched as Ferguson Action and coordinated a series of actions across the country after the Grand Jury declined to indict Officer Wilson. Over 200+ actions have taken place.
