= Open Society Foundations =

Grantmaking network founded by George Soros

- Abbreviation: OSF
- Founded: April 1993; 33 years ago
- Founder: George Soros
- Location(s): 224 West 57th Street; New York, NY 10019; U.S.
- Chair: Alexander Soros
- President: Binaifer Nowrojee
- Revenue: $396 million (2024)
- Expenses: $296 million (2024)
- Endowment: $23 billion (2025)
- Employees: 464 (2025)
- Website: opensocietyfoundations.org
- Formerly called: Open Society Institute

Open Society Foundations (OSF), formerly the Open Society Institute, is an American grantmaking network founded by billionaire business magnate George Soros. OSF financially supports progressive organizations. As of 2025, OSF has reported expenditures in excess of $24.2 billion since its establishment in 1993. OSF has assets of over $23 billion, making it one of the world's largest foundations. It has offices in over a dozen countries. The New York Times described OSF as "a sprawling political and philanthropic empire that seeks to advance a liberal, democratic agenda around the globe".

== History ==
On May 28, 1984, George Soros signed a contract between the Soros Foundation/New York City and the Hungarian Academy of Sciences, the founding document of the Soros Foundation/Budapest. This was followed by several foundations in the region to help countries move away from Soviet-style socialism in the Eastern Bloc.

In 1991, the foundation merged with the Fondation pour une Entraide Intellectuelle Européenne ("Foundation for European Intellectual Mutual Aid"), an affiliate of the Congress for Cultural Freedom, created in 1966 to imbue 'non-conformist' Eastern European scientists with anti-totalitarian and capitalist ideas.

In 1993, the Open Society Institute was created in the United States to support the Soros foundations in Central and Eastern Europe and Russia. The group's name was inspired by Karl Popper's 1945 book The Open Society and Its Enemies.

In August 2010, it started using the name Open Society Foundations (OSF).

In 1995, Soros stated that he believed there can be no absolute answers to political questions because the same principle of reflexivity applies as in financial markets.

In 2012, Christopher Stone joined the OSF as the second president. He replaced Aryeh Neier, who served as president from 1993 to 2012. Stone announced in September 2017 that he was stepping down as president. In January 2018, Patrick Gaspard was appointed president of the Open Society Foundations. He announced in December 2020 that he was stepping down as president. In January 2021, Mark Malloch-Brown was appointed president of the Open Society Foundations. On March 11, 2024, OSF announced that Binaifer Nowrojee would start as the group's new president on June 1, 2024.

In 2016, the OSF was reportedly the target of a cyber security breach. Documents and information reportedly belonging to the OSF were published by a website. The cyber security breach has been described as sharing similarities with Russian-linked cyberattacks that targeted other institutions, such as the Democratic National Committee.

In 2017, Soros transferred $18 billion to the foundation.

In 2023, George Soros handed over the leadership of the foundation to his son Alexander Soros, who soon announced layoffs of at least 40 percent of its international staff of then 800 and "significant changes" to the operating model.

During the second presidency of Donald Trump, federal prosecutors were directed to investigate the OSF. Prosecutors were told to consider possible charges including "racketeering, arson, wire fraud and material support for terrorism." The investigation was based on a claim that OSF "has poured over $80 million into groups tied to terrorism or extremist violence." In response, OSF issued a statement saying "The Open Society Foundations unequivocally condemn terrorism and do not fund terrorism" and calling the investigation a "politically motivated attack."

== Activities ==
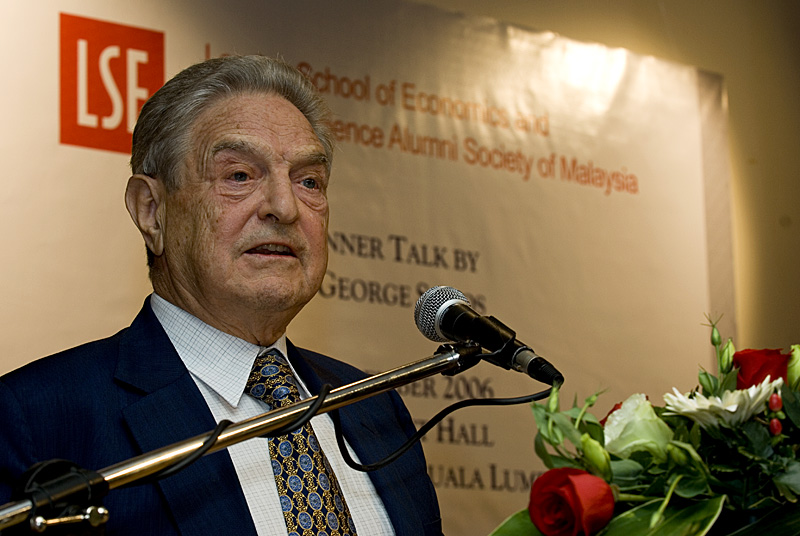
George Soros at a talk in Malaysia

The Library of Congress Soros Foundation Visiting Fellows Program was initiated in 1990.

Its $873 million budget in 2013 ranked as the second-largest private philanthropy budget in the United States, after the Bill and Melinda Gates Foundation budget of $3.9 billion.

The foundation reported granting at least $33 million to civil rights and social justice organizations in the United States. This funding included groups such as the Organization for Black Struggle and Missourians Organizing for Reform and Empowerment that supported protests in the wake of the killing of Trayvon Martin, the death of Eric Garner, the shooting of Tamir Rice and the shooting of Michael Brown. It reported granting to organizations outside of the United States as well. According to OpenSecrets, the OSF spends much of its resources on democratic causes around the world, and has also contributed to groups such as the Tides Foundation.

The OSF has been a major financial supporter of US immigration reform, including establishing a pathway to citizenship for undocumented immigrants.

OSF projects have included the National Security and Human Rights Campaign and the Lindesmith Center, which conducted research on drug reform.

In April 2022, OSF announced a grant of $20 million to the International Crisis Group.

OSF has given grants to Jewish Voice for Peace.

== Critical reception ==
In 2007, Nicolas Guilhot (a senior research associate at the French National Centre for Scientific Research) wrote in Critical Sociology that the Open Society Foundations is functionally conservative in supporting institutions that reinforce the existing social order, as the Ford Foundation and Rockefeller Foundation have done before them. Guilhot argues that control over the social sciences by moneyed interests, rather than by public officials, reinforced a neoliberal view of modernization.

An OSF effort in 2008 in the African Great Lakes region aimed at spreading human rights awareness among prostitutes in Uganda and other nations in the area was rejected by Ugandan authorities, who considered it an effort to legalize and legitimize prostitution.

Open Society Foundations has been criticized in the pro-Israel publications Tablet, Arutz Sheva and Jewish Press for funding the activist groups Adalah and I'lam, which they accuse of being anti-Israel and supporting the Boycott, Divestment and Sanctions movement. Among the documents released in 2016 by DCleaks, an OSF report reads "For a variety of reasons, we wanted to construct a diversified portfolio of grants dealing with Israel and Palestine, funding both Israeli Jewish and PCI (Palestinian Citizens of Israel) groups as well as building a portfolio of Palestinian grants and in all cases to maintain a low profile and relative distance—particularly on the advocacy front."

In 2013, NGO Monitor, an Israeli NGO, reported that "Soros has been a frequent critic of Israeli government policy, and does not consider himself a Zionist, but there is no evidence that he or his family holds any special hostility or opposition to the existence of the state of Israel. This report will show that their support, and that of the Open Society Foundations, has nevertheless gone to organizations with such agendas." The report says its objective is to inform the OSF, claiming: "The evidence demonstrates that Open Society funding contributes significantly to anti-Israel campaigns in three important respects:

1. Active in the Durban strategy;
2. Funding aimed at weakening United States support for Israel by shifting public opinion regarding the Israeli-Palestinian conflict and Iran;
3. Funding for Israeli political opposition groups on the fringes of Israeli society, which use the rhetoric of human rights to advocate for marginal political goals."

The report concludes, "Yet, to what degree Soros, his family, and the Open Society Foundations are aware of the cumulative impact on Israel and of the political warfare conducted by many of their beneficiaries is an open question."

In November 2015, Russia banned the group on its territory, declaring "It was found that the activity of the Open Society Foundations and the Open Society Institute Assistance Foundation represents a threat to the foundations of the constitutional system of the Russian Federation and the security of the state".

In 2016, India's Ministry of Home Affairs (MHA) placed the OSF on a watchlist forbidding them from extending any financial assistance to other NGOs or individuals without prior explicit permission.

In 2017, Open Society Foundations and other NGOs for open government and refugee assistance were targeted by authoritarian and populist governments emboldened by the first Trump administration. Several right-leaning politicians in eastern Europe regard many of the NGO groups to be irritants if not threats, including Liviu Dragnea in Romania, Szilard Nemeth in Hungary, Nikola Gruevski in North Macedonia (who called for "de-Sorosization"), and Jarosław Kaczyński of Poland (who has said that Soros-funded groups want "societies without identity"). Some of the Soros-funded advocacy groups in the region said the harassment and intimidation became more open after the 2016 election of Donald Trump in the United States. Stefania Kapronczay of the Hungarian Civil Liberties Union, which received half of its funding from Soros-backed foundations, claimed that Hungarian officials were "testing the waters" in an effort to see "what they can get away with."

In 2017, the government of Pakistan ordered the Open Society Foundations to cease operations in the country.

In May 2018, Open Society Foundations announced they would move its office from Budapest to Berlin, amid Hungarian government interference.

In November 2018, Open Society Foundations announced they would cease operations in Turkey and close their Istanbul and Ankara offices due to "false accusations and speculations beyond measure", amid pressure from the Turkish government including detention of liberal Turkish intellectuals and academics even tangentially associated with the foundation.

== See also ==
- Alliance for Open Society International
- Blinken Open Society Archives
- Budapest Open Access Initiative
- Central European University
- Colour revolution
- Directory of Open Access Journals
- Open society
- Open Society Foundations–Armenia
- Open Society Institute-Baltimore
- Transparency International
- Transparify
