= TWIB =

TWIB may refer to:

- This Week in Baseball, the weekly television program designed to show highlights of the previous week's Major League Baseball action
- This Week in Blackness, the African-American culture blog and web series
- The Woman in Black, a novel written by Susan Hill
- The Women in Black, the 2012 film based on the novel
