= Patience Zalanga =

American photojournalist

Patience Zalanga is a freelance photographer, photojournalist, and documentarian from Minneapolis-Saint Paul, Minnesota. Zalanga's focus is on documenting communities impacted by systemic injustice, particularly following the Black Lives Matter movement. Her work began in 2014 in Ferguson, Missouri, to document the impact on the community as it struggled with the killing of 18-year-old Black man Michael Brown by white Ferguson Police Department officer Darren Wilson and a grand jury's decision not to indict Wilson. She has since documented local protests in her hometown following the deaths of Philando Castile, Jamar Clark, and George Floyd.

Zalanga's work aims to amplify stories of individuals and communities affected by these events, but are regularly omitted from mainstream journalistic narratives.

== Early life ==
Patience Zalanga was born in Nigeria and raised in the St. Anthony Park neighborhood of Saint Paul. As a child, she printed transcripts from news reports and read them in front of the mirror, inspiring her future in documentary journalism. Her father, Samuel Zalanga, is a professor of Sociology at Bethel University in the suburbs of Minneapolis. She attributes her inquisitiveness and to the time she spent watching documentaries and reading from her father's curriculum.

Zalanga graduated from Como Park Senior High School in 2011 and enrolled in a nearly all-white private university hoping to pursue journalism, although she dropped out after only one semester. In 2014, she enrolled in Minneapolis Community and Technical College, taking her first photography classes and practicing on her friends and relatives.

== Photojournalism ==
After the killing of Michael Brown, Zalanga and her friend Nancy Musinguzi traveled to Ferguson "to stand in solidarity with the people of St. Louis." She brought her camera and documented the Black activists, focusing on the humanity and community in opposition to what she viewed was a skewed mainstream media perspective that focused on anger. Zalanga said that "The atmosphere in Ferguson, before the news of the non-indictment came out, it was just tense. People were really on edge about what was going to come. But it was also so loving. Everywhere there were people offering up food, water, a place to stqay. It was really comforting." Zalanga and Musinguzi connected with organizers of Millenial Activist United (MAU), the female auxiliary of the Black Lives Matter movement in Ferguson, and the male auxiliary Black Souljahz.

== Personal life ==
Beyond freelance journalism, Zalanga works as a Youth Justice Case Manager supporting young people in the youth carceral system and part time at a homeless shelter that serves single adult men and women in South Minneapolis.
