= Binaifer Nowrojee =

Kenyan human rights lawyer, OSF president

- Born: 1963 (age 62–63); London, England, UK
- Education: Bryn Mawr College (BA); Columbia University (JD); Harvard University (LLM)

Binaifer Nowrojee (born 1963 in London; raised in Nairobi, Kenya) is an international human rights lawyer. She has been president of the Open Society Foundations since June 2024 and is the first woman president of the organisation.

== Early life and education ==
Nowrojee was born in London to an Indian family of Parsi heritage and raised in Nairobi, Kenya. She is the daughter of Pheroze Nowrojee, a Kenyan human rights lawyer, poet, and writer. She attended Hospital Hill Primary School and Loreto Convent Msongari in Nairobi.

When she applied to a Kenyan university, she received no response. According to Nowrojee, she later learned from the institution's vice chancellor that he had received instructions not to admit her, which she attributed to the political repression of that period.

She holds a Juris Doctor from Columbia Law School and a Master of Laws from Harvard Law School.

== Career ==
=== Early legal career ===
After graduating, Nowrojee worked as a staff attorney at the Lawyers Committee for Human Rights (now Human Rights First).

=== Human Rights Watch ===
Nowrojee joined Human Rights Watch as legal counsel, where she spent roughly a decade investigating human rights violations across Africa. In 1996, she traveled to Rwanda to document sexual violence committed during the 1994 Rwandan genocide. The resulting report, Shattered Lives: Sexual Violence during the Rwandan Genocide and its Aftermath, was published by Human Rights Watch in September 1996.

Her evidence collection has been credited as contributing to the first prosecution of rape as a war crime at the International Criminal Tribunal for Rwanda, in the case of Prosecutor v. Akayesu (1998). She subsequently testified at the ICTR in the separate case of Prosecutor v. Karemera et al. in 2005.

=== Harvard Law School ===
Following her time at Human Rights Watch, Nowrojee served as a lecturer at Harvard Law School. She also held a fellowship at Harvard's Carr Center for Human Rights, where her research focused on how international tribunals deliver justice for rape survivors.

=== Open Society Foundations ===
Nowrojee joined the Open Society Foundations in 2004, leaving her position at Harvard Law School to become the founding director of the Open Society Initiative for East Africa, based in Nairobi, a role she held for almost ten years. She subsequently relocated to Singapore to become the organization's first regional director for Asia Pacific, serving in that role for seven years.

Nowrojee later took on leadership roles overseeing a restructuring of the Open Society Foundations that formally began in 2021, serving successively as vice president for organizational transformation and then vice president for programs. The restructuring included a 40 percent reduction in staff and the closure or conversion of some international offices.

In March 2024 the OSF Board of Directors unanimously appointed Nowrojee as president, succeeding Mark Malloch-Brown. Consequently, in June, she became the first woman to lead the Open Society Foundations, and the first woman from the Global South to hold the role.

In May 2026, the Open Society Foundations announced a $30 million, three-year commitment to organizations working to counter antisemitism and anti-Muslim hate in the United States and internationally.

She speaks publicly regarding authoritarian governments and the threats to democratic institutions and rights for women and LGBTQ+ communities. Her views have been featured in interviews with NPR, The Guardian, Deutsche Welle, the Associated Press, and the Washington Times.

== Recognition ==
Nowrojee contributes commentary to Project Syndicate and Foreign Policy on topics such as international humanitarian law, gender equality, and democratic backsliding. According to the International Law Institute, she received its 2025 Lifetime Impact Award, recognizing lifetime contributions to international law.

She has spoken at the Munich Security Conference (2026) and delivered a plenary address at the Women Deliver 2026 Conference in Melbourne, Australia.

== Works ==
- Nowrojee, Binaifer. Shattered Lives: Sexual Violence during the Rwandan Genocide and its Aftermath. Human Rights Watch, 1996.
