= Elon James White =

American journalist

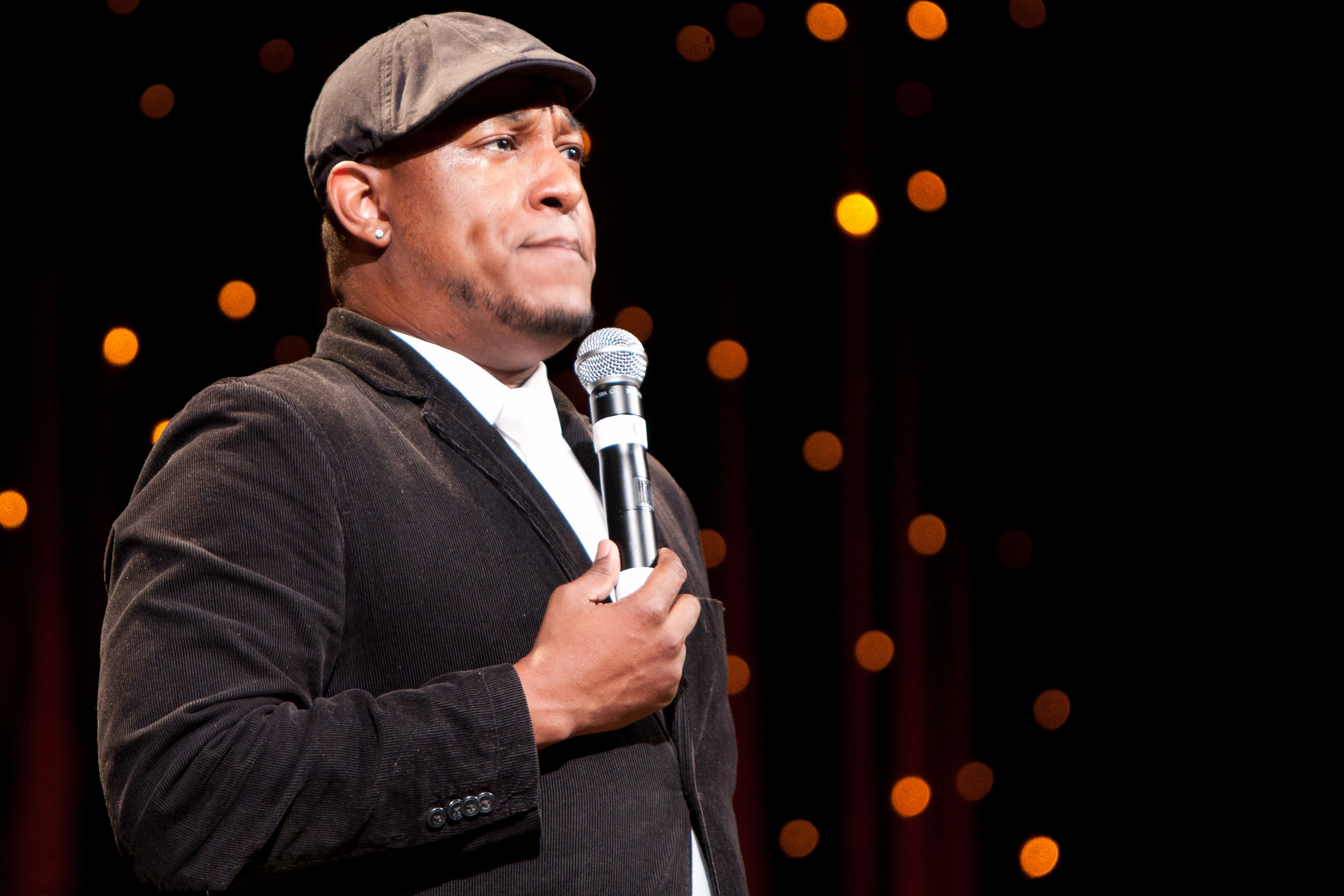
- Born: October 16, 1978 (age 48); Pittsburgh, PA

Comedy career
- Medium: Stand-up, writing
- Genres: Observational comedy, wit, satire, political satire, black comedy, sarcasm
- Subjects: African-American culture, American culture, everyday life, American politics, pop culture
- Website: elonjameswhite.com

Elon James White (born October 16, 1978) is a media creator, journalist, and CEO of This Week in Blackness.

White was born in Brooklyn, New York. He is the founder and editor in chief of This Week in Blackness and the Black Comedy Experiment. White is the host of the radio show and web series "This Week In Blackness" which has been featured on Crooks and Liars, Daily Kos, and Jack and Jill Politics. White is also a contributor to the Huffington Post, Salon.com, The Root, and is a part of the comedy troupe Laughing Liberally, the comedic arm of Living Liberally.

White has appeared as a featured commentator on Melissa Harris-Perry's MSNBC show, the VH1 series Black to the Future and The Great Debate as well as Current's Viewpoint (talk show), Countdown With Keith Olbermann and The Joy Behar Show. White was the recipient of four 2009 Black Weblog Awards including Best Humor Blog, Best MicroBlog (Twitter), Best Video Blog and Blog of the Year. White was also listed by Tulane professor & author Melissa Harris-Perry as being one of the "Top 50 Politicos to Watch"
