= Indivisible (organization) =

Progressive movement and organization in the United States

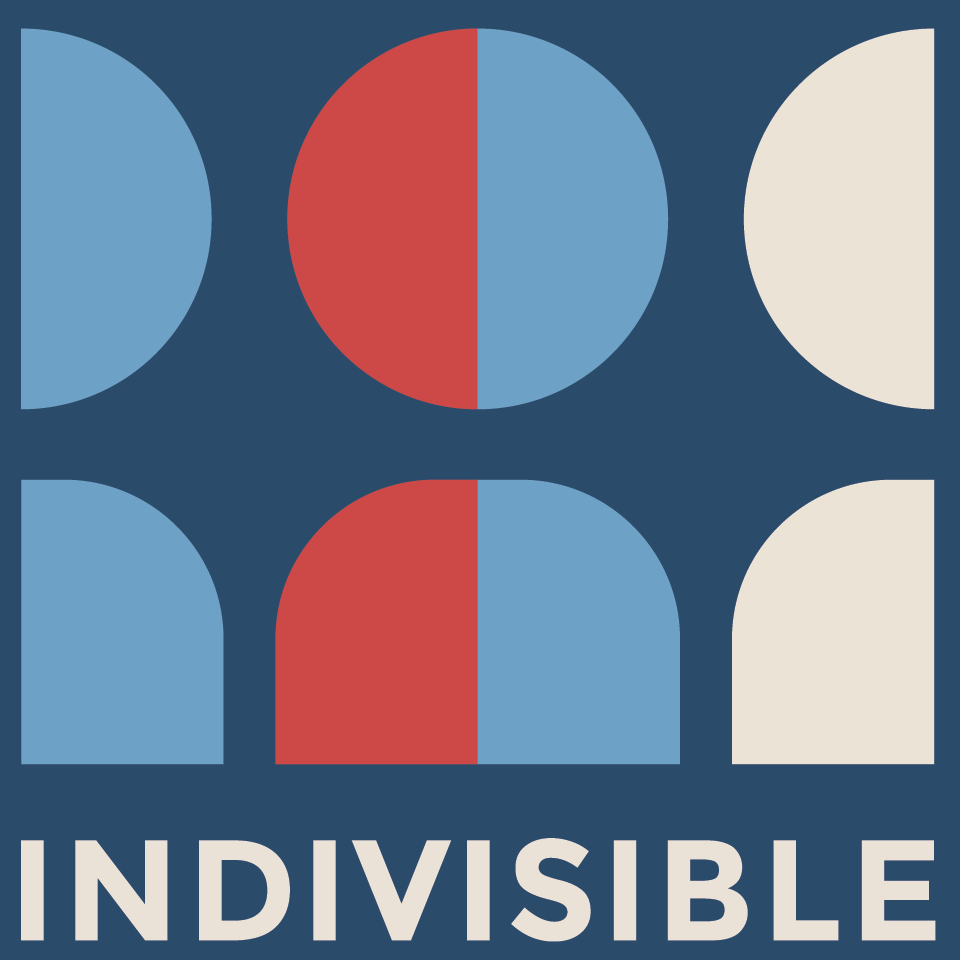
- Formation: 2016; 10 years ago
- Type: 501(c)(4) nonprofit organization
- Tax ID no.: 81-4944067
- Executive Directors: Leah Greenberg, Ezra Levin
- Affiliations: Indivisible Action (PAC)
- Website: indivisible.org

Indivisible is a progressive movement and organization in the United States initiated in 2016 as a reaction to the election of Donald Trump as president of the United States. The movement's organizational components include the Indivisible Project, Indivisible Civics, and Indivisible Action. The movement began with the online publication of a handbook written by congressional staffers with suggestions for attempting to peacefully resist the move to the right in the executive branch of the United States government under the Trump administration that was widely anticipated and feared by progressives. According to American urban policy analyst Peter Dreier, the goal of Indivisible is to "save American democracy" and "resume the project of creating a humane America that is more like social democracy than corporate plutocracy."

Indivisible's founders, Leah Greenberg and Ezra Levin, were included in Time Magazine's 100 Most Influential People of 2019.

== Origin ==
The movement started with the online publication of a 23-page handbook, Indivisible: A Practical Guide for Resisting the Trump Agenda. The authors of the document, most notably Ezra Levin, Jeremy Haile, Leah Greenberg, and Angel Padilla, were former Congressional staffers. Greenberg worked as an aide to Democratic Representative Tom Perriello of Virginia, while Levin, Greenberg's husband, worked as an aide to Lloyd Doggett, a Democratic Party member of the United States House of Representatives from Texas. After the 2016 presidential election, in mid-December 2016, Levin and Greenberg began working on an online guide in the form of a Google Document on how to make contact with congressional aides as a way of grieving over Trump's victory. Angel Padilla, Jeremy Haile, and dozens of other staffers for Democratic members of the United States Congress joined in the creation of the online publication.

The authors modeled their document after the Tea Party movement, which focused on local activism and obstructing the Democratic Party's agenda following the election of President Barack Obama in 2008. They thought that similar action taken by the left could be effective against what they perceived as Trump's "bigoted and anti-democratic agenda". The purpose of the guide was to encourage resistance to Trump's presidency, most notably by targeting Republican elected members of Congress by attending town halls, calling congressional officials, visiting their offices, and showing up at public events.

The guide was first published online on Google Docs on December 14, 2016, with Levin posting a link to it on his personal Twitter account. It soon went viral, with, among others, Robert Reich, Jonathan Chait, George Takei, and Miranda July circulating it online.

== History ==
Since the guide's publication, its authors have created a website with further resources on using the guide and organizing local movements. The guide is continuously updated and is available in English and Spanish. By February 4, 2017, less than two months from the publication of the Indivisible Guide, and about two weeks after Trump's first inauguration, more than 3,800 local groups identifying as "Indivisibles" had formed and declared their support for the movement. In February, they organized as a 501(c) organization.

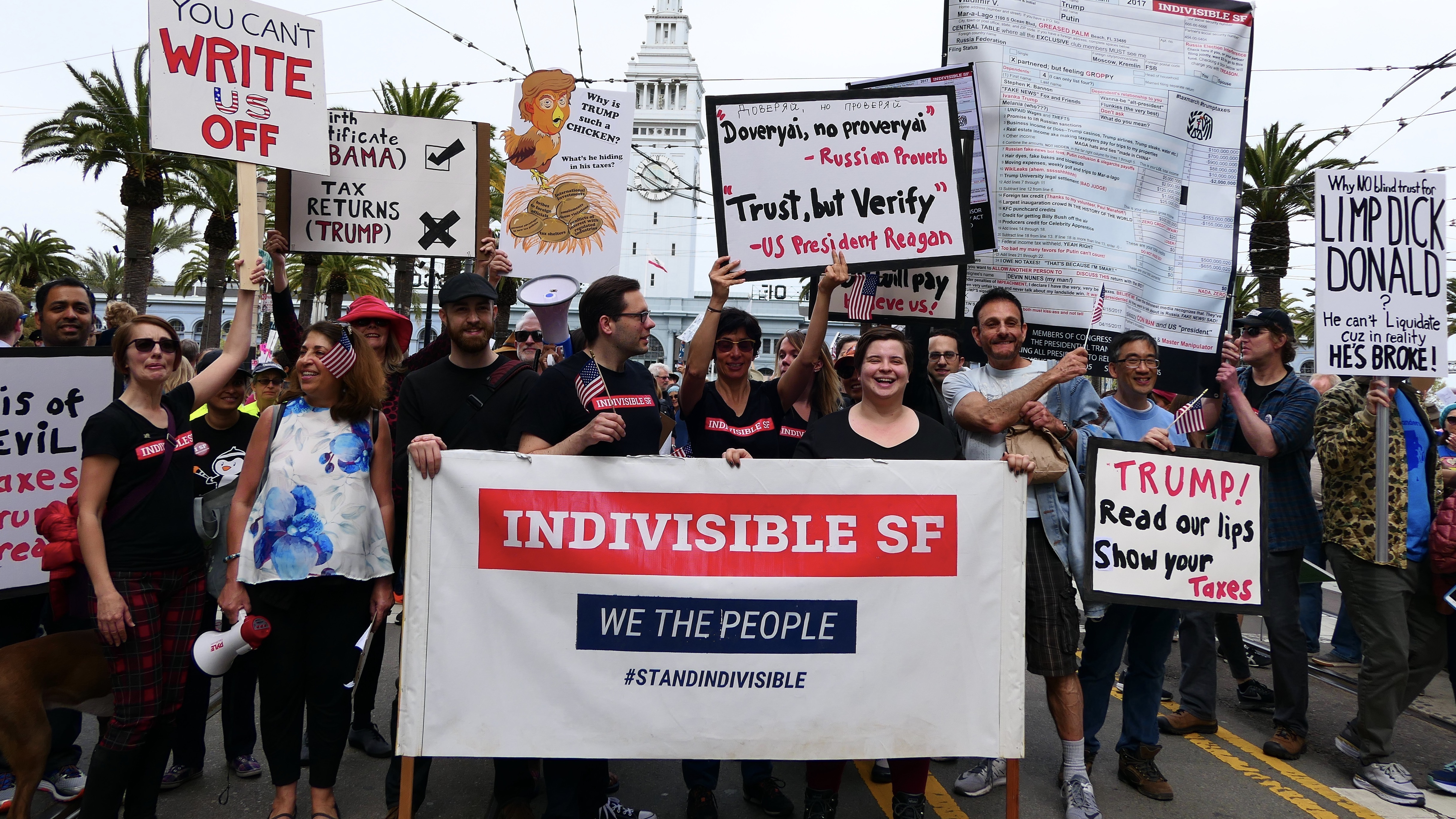
Indivisible members at Tax Day March in San Francisco in 2017

Many groups attended town halls, demonstrated against nominees for Trump's Cabinet, and worked with organizers of the Women's March. John Kasich and Mo Brooks acknowledged that the protests would affect efforts to repeal the Patient Protection and Affordable Care Act. David Weigel said the movement was a possible reason for the initial failure of Republicans to pass the American Health Care Act of 2017.

In 2018, the group and its volunteers contributed money, endorsements, and volunteer time to many House races, which was followed by Democrats winning back control of the chamber. In 2019, the group endorsed a series of events aimed at supporting the impeachment of Donald Trump.

The group continued its advocacy activities into the post-Trump era following his loss of the 2020 election. In 2021, Indivisible advocated in favor of Democrats' $3.5 trillion reconciliation bill. In October 2021, Indivisible planned to spend $1 million to protect eight Democratic incumbents in Congress, an effort that overlapped partly with that of the Democratic Congressional Campaign Committee. In May 2022, a board member of Indivisible Houston directly confronted Senator Ted Cruz about gun reform in the wake of the Uvalde shooting and the NRA convention. In June 2022, Indivisible planned to spend $7 million in the 2022 United States elections to highlight "MAGA extremism" to aid in the election of Democrats. On September 5, 2023, Indivisible Action endorsed President Joe Biden's 2024 re-election bid.

Since the inauguration of the second Trump administration in January 2025, the Indivisible organization has continued its activities and declared that the democracy of the republic is under threat and that the organization will not yield to fascism, pledging to stand together to fight in defense of rights, communities, and values. They post the organized efforts to protest and the Indivisible co-founders Leah Greenberg and Ezra Levin hold a weekly conversation regarding the news of the week, to answer questions, and to inform about calls to action.

On March 1, 2025, the Mad River Valley chapter of Indivisible protested JD Vance's ski trip visit in Vermont and held up signs calling him a "traitor", a day after the 2025 Trump–Zelenskyy Oval Office meeting. Later that month, a chapter of Indivisible organized a protest outside a Tesla store in Milford, Connecticut; around 300 people were seen at it. Ann Arbor Indivisible planned to picket outside a Tesla dealership in May. In the Wabash Valley, a local news outlet published that the organization’s goal was to "remake the democracy", with one Indivisible member saying, "We just want the government to stop being a thing that is by the billionaires and for the billionaires." In June, Indivisible and other organizations coordinated No Kings protests in over 2,000 communities in the United States as a countermove to Trump's U.S. Army 250th Anniversary Parade and to protest his administration. A follow up No Kings protest in October 2025 Indivisible helped coordinate had an estimated 7 million participants, and a March 2026 followup grew even larger, drawing an estimated 8 million protestors in 3,300 locations.

== Funding ==
In March 2017, Levin said that Indivisible had received over 10,000 donations that totaled over $500,000 since January through ActBlue. In October 2017, the New York Times reported that Indivisible had received almost $6 million since its inception, mostly through small donations via its website as well as from Reid Hoffman and organizations linked to Democracy Alliance donors. The latest top donors list included a number of prominent tech companies including Apple and Alphabet. In April 2025, The Hill reported that since 2017, Indivisible Project, which is the group’s 501(c) body, had received over $7.6 million from George Soros's Open Society Foundations.

== See also ==
- 50501 movement
- First 100 days of the second Donald Trump presidency
- Protests against Elon Musk
- Protests against the second presidency of Donald Trump
- Timeline of protests against Donald Trump
- The Resistance (American political movement)
- Tea Party movement
