= Black to the Future (TV series) =

- Genre: Documentary
- Starring: David Alan Grier
- Country of origin: United States
- Original language: English
- No. of seasons: 1
- No. of episodes: 4

Production
- Running time: 60 minutes

Original release
- Network: VH1
- Release: February 24 – February 27, 2009

Black to the Future is a 2009 television miniseries that originally aired on VH1 from February 24 to February 27, 2009. The show, which is a spin-off of the I Love the... series, discusses the history of events and trends about African Americans and is hosted by David Alan Grier. The title is a reference to the 1985 comedy film, Back to the Future.

== Commentators ==
- Debbie Allen
- Afrika Bambaataa
- Fantasia Barrino
- Ty Barnett
- Garcelle Beauvais
- Tyson Beckford
- Eric Benet
- Ahmed Best
- Alonzo Bodden
- Boyz II Men (Wanya Morris and Shawn Stockman)
- Bobby Brown
- Downtown Julie Brown
- Michelle Buteau
- Nick Cannon
- Jordan Carlos
- Hosea Chanchez
- Common
- Lavell Crawford
- Affion Crockett
- Mark Curry
- Tommy Davidson
- Bill Dawes
- Earthquake
- Dean Edwards
- Karith Foster
- Marina Franklin
- B.D. Freeman
- Godfrey
- Jessica Golden
- Macy Gray
- David Alan Grier
- Kyle Grooms
- Tiffany Haddish
- Kadeem Hardison
- Jeremy Hassell
- John Henton
- Ice-T
- Jesse Jackson
- Jim Jones
- Leslie Jones
- Khalil Kain
- Kool Moe Dee
- Kenny Lattimore
- Tom Lister, Jr.
- Faizon Love
- Loni Love
- Luenell
- MC Lyte
- Kathleen Madigan
- Method Man
- Jerry Minor
- Finesse Mitchell
- Modern Humorist (Michael Colton and John Aboud)
- Garrett Morris
- Phil Morris
- Tia Mowry
- Musiq
- Chuck Nice
- Patrice O'Neal
- Prince Paul
- Keith Powell
- Kevin Powell
- Donnell Rawlings
- Ray J
- Christopher Reid
- Salt-n-Pepa
- Stuart Scott
- Amanda Seales
- Keesha Sharp
- Sherri Shepherd
- Rondell Sheridan
- Sir Mix-a-Lot
- Sherrod Small
- Janell Snowden
- Hal Sparks
- Aries Spears
- Rozonda Thomas
- Guy Torry
- Harvey Walden IV
- Jimmie Walker
- George Weisgerber
- Elon James White
- Kym Whitley
- Hal Williams
- Michelle Williams
- Gina Yashere

== Recurring segments ==
- Brothers with Badges: Ice-T talks about Black actors that played police officers in the given decade.
- The Most Groovetastic Songs: Chilli lists three popular songs in the given decade.
- Catchphrases of Color: Jesse Jackson lives through popular phrases in the given decade.
- Cosmic Girls: Sir Mix-a-Lot discusses women he liked in the given decade.
- Fashions of the Decade: Downtown Julie Brown shows us fashion styles in the given decade.
- Whatta Men: Salt-N-Pepa talk about guys they liked in the given decade.
- Rants: Each celebrity gives an opinion on a topic that was covered by the given decade.
- Funniest Fellas: Loni Love lists funny comedians the given decade.
- Soul Sisters: Fantasia Barrino shows us the best female singers in the given decade.

== Topics covered by decade ==
Notice: Throughout the specials they discuss various music, film, and TV shows and spoil the endings of them.

=== The 1970s ===
- Good Times
- The Jackson 5
- Afro
- The Wiz
- Sanford and Son
- Soul Train
- Funk
- The Jeffersons
- Barry White
- Shaft
- What's Happening!!
- Stevie Wonder
- The White Shadow
- Harlem Globetrotters
- Roots

Brothers with Badges of the 1970s: Clarence Williams III, Cleavon Little, and Richard Roundtree

The Most Groovetastic Songs of the 1970s: "Let's Get It On" by Marvin Gaye, "Le Freak" by Chic, and "We Are Family" by Sister Sledge

Catchphrases of Color of the 1970s: "Dy-no-mite!", "Hey, hey, hey!" (Fat Albert), and "Elizabeth, I'm comin'"

Cosmic Girls of the 1970s: Tina Turner, Thelma Evans, and Donna Summer

Fashions of the 1970s: Dashikis, bell-bottoms, afro picks, gold lame, platform shoes, relaxed hair, polyester suits, and shiny alligator shoes

Whatta Men of the 1970s: Billy Dee Williams, Sidney Poitier, and Julius Erving

Sir Mix-a-Lot's Rant on Funk

Funniest Fellas of the 1970s: Flip Wilson, Garrett Morris, Sammy Davis, Jr., and Richard Pryor

Soul Sisters of the 1970s: Gloria Gaynor, Patti LaBelle, and Gladys Knight

=== The 1980s ===
- Mr. T
- Breakdancing
- Diff'rent Strokes
- New Edition
- Jesse Jackson's 1984 presidential campaign
- 227
- Michael Jackson
- Rap
- Mike Tyson
- "Party All the Time" by Eddie Murphy
- Whitney Houston
- The Color Purple
- Hollywood Shuffle
- Lionel Richie
- Do the Right Thing

Brothers with Badges of the 1980s: Carl Weathers, Eddie Murphy, and Philip Michael Thomas

The Most Groovetastic Songs of the 1980s: "Don't Worry, Be Happy" by Bobby McFerrin, "Super Freak" by Rick James, and "Mary, Mary" by Run-D.M.C.

Catchphrases of Color of the 1980s: "Did I do that", "I pity the fool" (Mr. T), and "What you talkin' 'bout, Willis? (Gary Coleman)"

Cosmic Girls of the 1980s: Lisa Bonet (The Cosby Show), Holly Robinson Peete, and Vanessa Williams

Fashions of the 1980s: Asymmetrical haircut, door bangers, leather bomber jacket, tracksuit, kangol, Adidas, African medallions, dreads, and the nefertiti hat

Whatta Men of the 1980s: Malcolm-Jamal Warner, Al B. Sure!, and LL Cool J

Patrice O'Neal's Rant on 227

Funniest Fellas of the 1980s: Bill Cosby, Eddie Murphy, Robert Guillaume, and Whoopi Goldberg

Soul Sisters of the 1980s: Tina Turner, Sade (The Sweetest Taboo), and Chaka Khan

=== The 1990s ===
- Martin
- Waiting to Exhale
- Michael Jordan
- Hootie & the Blowfish
- House Party
- Forty-ounce beer
- The Arsenio Hall Show
- Family Matters
- Million Man March
- Dr. Dre and Snoop Doggy Dogg
- Boyz n the Hood
- Mary J. Blige
- Living Single
- Tae Bo
- 1992 Los Angeles riots
- In Living Color

Brothers with Badges of the 1990s: Reginald VelJohnson (Carl), Chris Tucker, and Wesley Snipes

The Most Groovetastic Songs of the 1990s: "What is Love" by Haddaway, "Mo' Money, Mo' Problems" by The Notorious B.I.G., and "Creep" by TLC

Catchphrases of Color of the 1990s: "Homey don't play that", "Show me the money!" (Cuba Gooding Jr. from Jerry Maguire), and "Whoomp, there it is!"

Cosmic Girls of the 1990s: Toni Braxton, Mariah Carey, and En Vogue

Fashions of the 1990s: Overalls, HBCU sweatshirt, Halle Berry haircut, Jordans, gear from Cross Colors, high-top fade, baggy jeans, timberlands, and bandanas

Whatta Men of the 1990s: Lenny Kravitz, Djimon Hounsou, and Denzel Washington

Chilli's Rant on Waiting to Exhale

Funniest Fellas of the 1990s: Bill Bellamy, Charles S. Dutton, Mark Curry, and Sinbad

Soul Sisters of the 1990s: Erykah Badu (Tyrone), En Vogue, and Angie Stone (No More Rain)

=== The 2000s ===
- I Am Legend
- Williams sisters
- "Hot in Herre" by Nelly
- Girlfriends
- Chappelle's Show
- "Yeah!" by Usher
- Tyra Banks
- Undercover Brother
- Beyoncé
- Barry Bonds
- Ray
- Mariah Carey's The Emancipation of Mimi album
- Barbershop
- Kanye West
- Barack Obama

Brothers with Badges of the 2000s: Denzel Washington, Anthony Anderson, and Ice-T (Law & Order)

The Most Groovetastic Songs of the 2000s: "In da Club" by 50 Cent, "I'm Sprung" by T-Pain, and "It's Goin' Down" by Yung Joc

Catchphrases of Color of the 2000s: "King Kong ain't got nothin' on me!", and "Wazzup?"

Cosmic Girls of the 2000s: Mya, Condoleezza Rice, and Halle Berry

Fashions of the 2000s: Diamond Grillz, black T, Air Force Ones, Members Only jacket, puff vest, body tattoos, fine suit, matte link, and a clothing line with a name

Whatta Men of the 2000s: Derek Jeter, 50 Cent, and Kobe Bryant

Mark Curry's Rant on Barry Bonds

Funniest Fellas of the 2000s: Bernie Mac, Steve Harvey, Tracy Morgan, and Chris Rock

Soul Sisters of the 2000s: Alicia Keys (Fallin'), Jill Scott, and Toni Braxton
