= Maury Travis =

American serial killer (1965–2002)

Maury Troy Travis
- Mugshot of Travis
- Born: October 25, 1965; St. Louis, Missouri, U.S.
- Died: June 10, 2002 (aged 36); St. Louis County Jail, Missouri, U.S.
- Other names: The Streetwalker Strangler; The Bi-State Strangler
- Convictions: Armed robbery (1989); Possession of drugs (1998)
- Criminal charge: Kidnapping resulting in death (2 counts) (died before trial)
- Penalty: 15 years (robbery; paroled in 1994); Two years probation (drug offenses)

Details
- Victims: 12–18+
- Span of crimes: 2000–2002
- Country: United States
- State: Missouri
- Date apprehended: June 7, 2002

Maury Troy Travis (October 25, 1965 – June 10, 2002) was an American serial killer. Travis was named in a federal criminal complaint for the murders of two women. At the time of the murders, he was a hotel waiter, and on parole for a 1989 robbery. While Travis claimed in a letter to have murdered 17 women, some authorities were doubtful; others thought he may have murdered up to 20 women. He committed suicide by hanging in custody in St. Louis County, Missouri, after being arrested for murder.

== Known victims ==
At least one videotape showing Travis murdering and/or torturing some of his victims was found in the search of his home in Ferguson, Missouri, a suburb of St. Louis. He is believed to have killed at least 4 women: Alysia Greenwade, whose body was discovered April 1, 2001, in Illinois (after having been last seen in Missouri), and Betty James, whose body was discovered about two months later in Missouri (after having been last seen in Illinois). He gave a tip to a reporter that led to the discovery of body of a third unidentified woman in 2002.

== Investigation ==
From May to October 2001, four other women were tortured and strangled: Teresa Wilson, Verona Thompson, Yvonne Crues, and Brenda Beasley. The St. Louis Post-Dispatch ran a profile piece on Wilson, to which Travis responded by sending an anonymous letter and a computer-generated map. The letter had a return address of I THRALLDOM, a bondage website, but no other identification. However, the map was recognized to have come from Expedia.com, and further investigation traced it back to Travis, leading to his arrest.

In his letter to the newspaper, Travis wrote, "I'll tell you where many others are." And then: "To prove I'm real, here's directions to number seventeen." Travis was arrested on a federal criminal complaint and, while in the custody of the U.S. Marshals Service, was housed at a St. Louis County jail facility in Clayton. Investigators discovered a torture chamber at Travis' residence, torture instruments, a stun gun, newspaper clippings of some of his crimes, and videotapes of Travis killing or abusing victims.

In all, Travis was linked to 12 murders, including Mary Shields and Cassandra Walker, who were killed in 2000 and 2001 respectively, as well the murders of three formerly unidentified females and one still unidentified female in 2002. In 2025, three of Travis' victims were identified as Kelly Johnson, Crystal Lay and Carol Hemphill.

== Death ==
Before he could be put on trial for the crimes, Travis hanged himself on June 10, 2002, in his jail cell. Travis had been placed on suicide watch (i.e. checked upon at 15-minute intervals); however two consecutive checks were missed by the guards, resulting in enough time for Travis to hang himself.

== In the media ==
Forensic Files covered the story of Travis' crime spree in the episode "X Marks the Spot". Cold Case Files covered the story in the episode "A Map to Murder". Evil, I also covered the story in an episode "Hell's Basement".

While watching the Cold Case Files documentary on the A&E network, the existing tenant of Travis' house found out about its history. It was revealed that her landlord, who would not return the money or break the lease when confronted, was Travis' mother. Upon being approached by the local housing authority, the landlord subsequently agreed to rescind the lease.

His killings are also discussed on Last Podcast on the Left, Episode 91: "Black Serial Killers Part 1: Call Me God".

== See also ==
- List of serial killers in the United States
- List of serial killers by number of victims
