= Hands Up United =

Organization based in Ferguson, Missouri

- Formation: 2014
- Purpose: Social justice
- Location: Ferguson, Missouri
- Region served: United States
- Key people: Taureen "Tory" Russell; Tef Poe
- Affiliations: Organization for Black Struggle; Black Lives Matter
- Website: handsupunited.org

Hands Up United is a social justice activist organization based in Ferguson, Missouri, formed after the fatal shooting of Michael Brown by a police officer. The organization seeks justice in the Michael Brown case and prevention of future incidents nationwide as well as more accountability for police and improving transparency in police and justice departments across the United States. It also offers web technology training workshops to address issues related to the digital divide and economic equality.

== History ==
=== Establishment ===
Hands Up United rose to prominence when it joined with other organizations to publicly demand the resignation of Ferguson police chief Tom Jackson and mayor James Knowles III. They also called for the recusal of county prosecutor McCulloch. It has coordinated and been involved in large-scale protests in the St. Louis area.

In response to the killing of Michael Brown and related unrest, the organization issued a set of eleven demands for local and national leaders including: the immediate release of jailed protesters, the identification and suspension of officers accused of using excessive force, and a demand that President Obama visit Ferguson. Local demands were stated on behalf of local organizations such as the Organization for Black Struggle and Missourians Organizing for Reform and Empowerment while national demands were developed by organizations such as Color of Change, Freedom Side, and Dream Defenders.

In August 2014, the organization coordinated a nationwide demonstration called "Hands Up, Walk Out" in support of Hands Up United's mission of establishing more accountability for police, releasing people arrested during protests and improving transparency in police and justice departments across the United States. Two months later in October 2014, two months after the shooting death of Michael Brown, Hands Up United in collaboration with the Organization for Black Struggle and Missourians Organizing for Reform and Empowerment organized a weekend of activities "to build momentum for a nationwide movement against police violence." The weekend featured a rally outside the St. Louis Justice Center, marches, candlelight vigil, educational programs, and panel discussions.

Following the Shooting of Tamir Rice in Cleveland, Ohio, Hands Up United co-founder Tory Russell noted that Hands Up United was not involved in "the civil rights movement" but the "oppressed peoples movement" which includes people of many different backgrounds including gays and those with low socioeconomic status with goals of improving bias within the judicial, legislative, and educational systems.

=== United Nations Committee Against Torture statement ===
On November 12, 2014, Michael Brown's parents submitted a prepared statement with Hands Up United, the Organization for Black Struggle, and Missourians Organizing for Reform and Empowerment to the United Nations Committee Against Torture stating that their son's death and the "excessive force by police officers on peaceful protesters" in Ferguson in the weeks that followed violated the principles of the U.N. convention entitled Convention against Torture and Other Cruel, Inhuman or Degrading Treatment or Punishment. The statement made several requests of the United Nations including: recommending the immediate arrest of police officer Darren Wilson, the resignation of Police Chief Thomas Jackson, and granting amnesty to protesters arrested during related demonstrations. It also urged that the Ferguson Police Department be held responsible for "systematically targeting and harassing residents of color in a predatory and degrading manner".

== Technology training ==
In December 2014, the organization started a crowd-funding campaign to raise funds for the Ferguson First Youth Tech Program, a new program that aims to teach web development to Ferguson's youth to spur business growth, technological projects, and movements.
