= Leah Greenberg =

American political activist (born 1987)

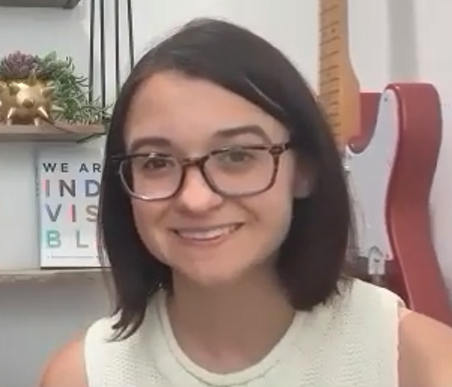
- Greenberg in 2025
- Born: Leah Francis Greenberg; 1987 (age 38–39)
- Education: Carleton College (BA); Tufts University (MA)
- Occupation: Political activist
- Organization: Indivisible
- Spouse: Ezra Levin (m. 2015)
- Greenberg's voice Greenberg on her early political career and the Indivisible movement. Recorded July 4, 2025
- Website: indivisible.org

Leah Francis Greenberg is an American political activist and co-founder of the progressive non-profit organization Indivisible. She is co-author of We Are Indivisible: A Blueprint for Democracy After Trump, published in 2019. Greenberg, along with Indivisible co-founder, Ezra Levin, was named by Time in 2019 as one of Time's 100 most influential people in the world. She and Levin were selected by Politico in 2017 and GQ in 2018 for their annual lists of most powerful and influential people in Washington DC. She is currently the co-Executive Director of Indivisible.

== Early life and education ==
Greenberg was raised in Chevy Chase, Maryland. She is Jewish. She graduated from Carleton College in 2008 with a Bachelor of Arts Degree. She later studied at Tufts University, where she received a Master's Degree in Law and Diplomacy.

== Career ==
Greenberg began her career working for the philanthropic foundation Humanity United where she managed projects to combat human trafficking and slavery. She was an Advisor on human trafficking at the State Department's Quadrennial Diplomacy and Development Review, and later was hired as a staff assistant in the Office of Congressman Tom Perriello of Virginia. Greenberg was the policy director for Perriello's gubernatorial campaign in 2017.

Greenberg, Levin, Jeremy Haile, and Angel Padilla – all former Congressional staffers – created the online publication Indivisible: A Practical Guide for Resisting the Trump Agenda in late 2016 in response to the election of Donald Trump as President of the United States. The guide went viral and the project quickly became a progressive movement. Levin and Greenberg created a website and encouraged supporters to form their own local chapters. In February, 2017, the Indivisible co-founders formed a 501(c) organization, with Levin designated as Indivisible's first President and Greenberg as Vice-President.

== Personal life ==
Greenberg married Ezra Levin in 2015.

== Recognition ==
- 2017 Greenberg and Levin were ranked #2 on the Politico 50 list of top thinkers and visionaries transforming American politics
- 2018 Greenberg and Levin named one of GQ's 50 most powerful people in Trump's Washington
- 2019 Named one of Time magazine's 100 most influential people in the world

== Selected publications ==
- Greenberg, Leah; Levin, Ezra (2019). We are Indivisible: A Blueprint for Democracy after Trump. Atria/One Signal Publishers. ISBN 978-1982129972.
