= Millennial Activists United =

American social justice organization

- Abbreviation: MAU
- Formation: August 2014
- Founder: Brittany Ferrell, Alexis Templeton, Ashley Yates
- Founded at: Ferguson, Missouri
- Affiliations: Black Lives Matter Movement

Millennial Activists United (MAU) is social justice organization in the U.S., based in Ferguson Missouri. The group works to end racism as well as police brutality in the United States.

== History ==
The group was founded primarily by Brittany Ferrell, Alexis Templeton, and Ashley Yates following the police shooting of Michael Brown in August, 2014. The three quit their jobs to work on the organization full-time. MAU has worked at educating the public and organizing rallies and protests. MAU is associated with the Black Lives Matter movement. They encourage more young women to get involved in activism, particularly African American women.

The founders of MAU wanted to get millennials more involved in activism, and believe that using means of communication that millennials use, such as Twitter, would have a larger impact on the issues they wanted to campaign about. Yates said in a 2014 NPR interview, "There were no other organizations out there that were doing the work that we wanted to do, that had the type of people - younger people, that were utilizing the tools that we were utilizing so effectively to get the word out and really become our own media."

Before naming themselves MAU, the group were providing food for other protesters, and providing medical aid to those affected by tear gas used on them by the police. The members of MAU have a collective agreement to support each other whether their decisions and/or actions are right or wrong.

Ferrell and Templeton, who are life partners, said in 2015 that MAU was established due to the lack of black-centered organizations featuring women. Ferrell said in the interview that without the work of black women, the movements pertaining to black lives would not be as evolved or advanced to where they are today. Zakiya Jemmott, another member of MAU, spoke about the media excluding women from the news stories, and said that black women lose their lives from police encounters, not just black men. MAU members believe that the government currently in place in the US does not serve them properly. They believe that to protect black people and eliminate police racism that may be occurring will require all law officers to wear body cameras, and to have civilian review boards in which all members of all communities can review interactions with law officers. Ferrell and Templeton, believed that nonviolent resistance was the most effective way to begin the movements. Templeton said that the purpose of the protests were simply to be noticed and heard, by generally being an inconvenience to the public until they would be listened to. MAU also helped to plan the four-day long Ferguson Action protest in October, 2014, one of the largest protests in the United States, rallying a couple of thousand people.

MAU has members that are also self-described as queer. Yates said that in small cities in the US it is difficult to identify as black and queer, rather than just black or queer, and that MAU is not only a group pushing for the end of racial inequality, but also making space for multiple identities. MAU works alongside other activist groups that are working towards putting an end to systemic violence and racial inequality, thus leading to the commencement of Ferguson Action, formerly known as October Ferguson.

== Awards and recognition ==
MAU won the Elliott-Black Award in 2016 after being nominated by the Ethical Society of St.Louis. The group was also on the short list for Time Magazine's Time Person of the Year in 2014 (along with other Ferguson protestors) as well as Ebony magazine's "Power 100" list in 2015.

== Controversies ==
The group has protested in the presence of police officers equipped in protective gear, launching tear gas, rubber bullets, and swinging batons toward the protesters. During one protest in 2015, Ferrell was accused of kicking and damaging a woman's SUV while the woman attempted to drive through the protest, which took place blocking a highway. MAU members said that it was impossible for Ferrell to cause damage greater than five thousand dollars with her foot.

Members of the black community have claimed that MAU is "destroying the black family" and "pushing the gay agenda" due to the fact that the organization contains many members that identify as LGBTQ+. Ferrell said of the allegations, "My sexuality has nothing to do with you and how you receive it. Just as I respect you for who you are, I need you to respect me as I am, and not expect me to separate myself from my sexuality."

Oprah Winfrey and Al Sharpton have made statements against the Black Lives Matter movement. In these criticisms, it has been said that these campaigns are more generational rather than substantive. Members of MAU have said that their motive for acquiring younger generations is that they have the loudest voices and have the best means to elicit change. Ferrell and Templeton commented on Winfrey's criticisms offering the explanation that due to her fame and wealth, she has been disconnected from the black community living in lesser areas.
