= Missourians Organizing for Reform and Empowerment =

Nonprofit organization in Missouri, United States

- Purpose: Social justice
- Location: St. Louis, Missouri
- Region served: United States
- Executive Director: Jeff Ordower
- Organizers: Arielle Klagsbrun, Derek Laney, Julia Ho, Molly Gott, Zach Chasnoff
- Affiliations: New Economy Coalition; Rising Tide North America; Organization for Black Struggle; Hands Up United
- Website: organizemo.org

Missourians Organizing for Reform and Empowerment (MORE) is a nonprofit, nonpartisan and social justice activist organization based in St. Louis, Missouri focused on improving economic equality for citizens of Missouri. The organization partners with a number of activist networks in the United States including New Economy Coalition, Rising Tide North America, and others.

== History ==
=== Activities ===
==== Fed Up, 2014 ====
In November 2014, MORE was involved in the "Fed Up" campaign composed of 20 community and labor groups who met with Federal Reserve Chair Janet Yellen to present proposals related to extending central bank stimulus and increasing public input on monetary policy.

==== United Nations Committee Against Torture statement with parents of Michael Brown, 2014 ====
On November 12, 2014, Michael Brown's parents submitted a prepared statement with Missourians Organizing for Reform and Empowerment, Hands Up United and the Organization for Black Struggle to the United Nations Committee Against Torture stating that their son's death and the "excessive force by police officers on peaceful protesters" in Ferguson in the weeks that followed violated the principles of the U.N. convention entitled Convention against Torture and Other Cruel, Inhuman or Degrading Treatment or Punishment. The statement made several requests of the United Nations including: recommending the immediate arrest of police officer Darren Wilson, the resignation of Police Chief Thomas Jackson, and granting amnesty to protesters arrested during related demonstrations. It also urged that the Ferguson Police Department be held responsible for "systematically targeting and harassing residents of color in a predatory and degrading manner".
