= Pheroze Nowrojee =

Kenyan lawyer (1941–2025)

Pheroze Nowrojee (1941–2025) was a Kenyan lawyer and a human rights defender. He served as a senior counsel and advocate of the High courts of Kenya, Zanzibar, and Tanzania, specifically practicing human rights, political and constitutional defense.

== Early life and education ==
Pheroze Nowrojee was born in 1941 in a family of Indian descent. His grandfather arrived in East Africa in April 1896 during the construction of the Kenya-Uganda railway line.

He attended the Catholic Parochial School in Nairobi for his primary education and Billimorja High School in India for his High school studies. Upon completion he joined Bombay University in Tanzania and later pursued a Master of Laws in Yale University in the United States.

== Career ==
Pheroze's legal career began in 1965 when he was admitted to the bar. He also lectured law at the University of Dar es Salaam between 1974 and 1977 the University of Nairobi in 1979 up to 1985, and the Kenya School of Law between 1968 and 1970, and 1978 to 1985.

== Published Works ==
Pheroze authored four books.

- Pio Gama Pinto: Patriot for Social Justice
- A Vote for Kenya: The Elections and the Constitution
- A Kenyan Journey
- Conserving the Intangible

== Awards ==
Pheroze received various awards in his legal profession including:

- International Commission Of Jurists (Kenya) IJ Jurist Of The Year, 1995
- The International Bar Association (IBA) Bernard Simons Human Rights Prize, 2002–2004
- The Law Society Of Kenya Roll Of Honour, 2005
- The Maasai People, Safeguarding Rights Award, 2007
- The Cb Madan Constitution Prize 2014
