= Brittany Ferrell =

Freedom Fighter

Brittany Ferrell is a Black American civil rights activist, political organizer, and freedom fighter from St. Louis, Missouri. Ferrell co-founded Millennial Activists United, a Black and queer women-led organization that facilitated intentional civic engagement and strategic political action around Ferguson, Missouri. Ferrell co-founded Millennial Activists United in light of the killing of Michael Brown, hoping to motivate youths to take a stand against racism and racial injustice. Millennial Activists United was founded in regards to the disproportionate number of women and LGBTQ individuals in leadership positions. Ferrell participates in rallies, attends city council meetings and uses social media to spread awareness.

In August 2015, Ferrell was arrested after participating in a protest that blocked I-70.

In 2017 Ferrell participated in the Digital Blackness in the Archive Symposium in Ferguson, MO, an all-Black conference organized by Documenting the Now where she discussed her experiences.

Ferrell earned her Bachelors in Science of Nursing from University of Missouri–St. Louis and is a high-risk obstetric nurse. As of 2019 she is pursuing a Masters of Public Health at Washington University focusing on maternal and fetal health.
