= Ezra Levin =

American political activist (born 1986)

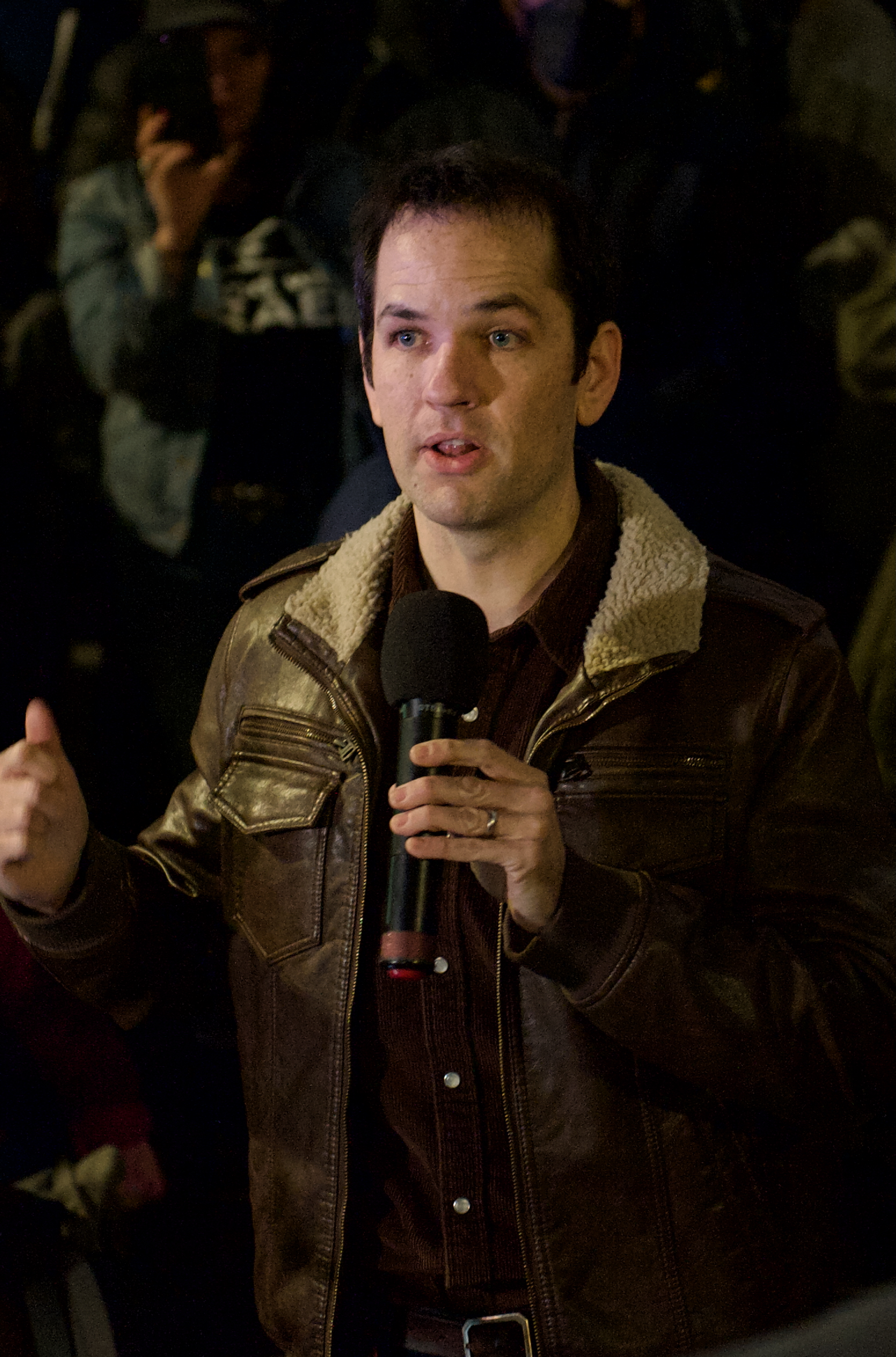
- Levin at a protest outside the Treasury Building in February 2025
- Born: Ezra Philip Levin; 1986 (age 39–40)
- Education: Carleton College (BA); Princeton University (MPA)
- Occupation: Political activist
- Organization: Indivisible
- Spouse: Leah Greenberg (m. 2015)
- Levin's voice Levin on Democratic resistance to the One Big Beautiful Bill Act. Recorded July 4, 2025
- Website: indivisible.org

Ezra Philip Levin is an American political activist and co-founder of the progressive non-profit organization Indivisible. He is co-author of We Are Indivisible: A Blueprint for Democracy After Trump, published in 2019. Levin, along with Indivisible co-founder Leah Greenberg, were named by Time in 2019 as being among the 100 most influential people in the world. He and Greenberg were selected by Politico in 2017 and GQ in 2018 for their annual lists of most powerful and influential people in Washington, D.C. He is currently co-executive director of Indivisible.

== Early life and education ==
Levin grew up in Buda, Texas. He is Jewish. He graduated from Carleton College in 2007. He earned a master's degree from the Woodrow Wilson School of Public and International Affairs at Princeton University in 2013.

== Career ==
Levin began his career at AmeriCorps VISTA in San Jose, California, from 2007 to 2008. The following year, he became deputy policy director for Congressman Lloyd Doggett and served from 2008 to 2011. Levin was an associate director of federal policy at Prosperity Now from 2012 until 2017, where his focus was on homelessness and poverty.

In late 2016, Levin, Greenberg, Jeremy Haile, and Angel Padilla, all former congressional staffers, created the online publication Indivisible: A Practical Guide for Resisting the Trump Agenda in response to the election of Donald Trump as president of the United States. The guide went viral, and the project quickly became a progressive movement. Levin and Greenberg created a website and encouraged supporters to form their own local chapters. In February 2017, the Indivisible co-founders formed a 501(c)(4) organization, with Levin designated as Indivisible's first president and Greenberg as vice president.

== Personal life ==
Levin married Leah Greenberg in 2015.

== Selected publications ==
- Greenberg, Leah; Levin, Ezra (2019). We are Indivisible: A Blueprint for Democracy after Trump. Atria/One Signal Publishers. ISBN 978-1982129972.
