= This Week in Blackness =

This Week in Blackness (also referred to as TWiB!) was an independent digital media platform which acts as a hub for a network of multimedia projects. Founded in 2008 during the presidential campaign season it is also the home of the video series of the same name hosted by Elon James White. The Blog was nominated for 4 Black Weblog Awards in 2009 and won 3 including "Blog of the Year." The site combines pointed criticism of politics and pop culture with social activism and urban humor.

This Week in Blackness originally published the controversial "Notes From a Phantom Negro: Skip Gates, Please Sit Down" discussing the arrest of Henry Louis Gates Jr. which was then republished by Salon.com The blog also originally posted "Message From The Average Black Person" which later was published by The Huffington Post and AlterNet.

The site is best known for the critically acclaimed web series by the same name. TWiB! Prime with Elon James White, in both video and podcast format, has been featured on DailyKos, Crooks and Liars, The Huffington Post and Salon.

== See also ==
- Political podcast
