= Tef Poe =

American rapper

- Born: Kareem Jackson; United States
- Origin: St. Louis, Missouri
- Genres: Hip hop
- Occupations: Rapper, musician

Kareem Jackson, known by his stage name Tef Poe, is an American rapper, musician and activist.

== Early life ==
Poe was born in St. Louis, Missouri.

== Career ==
Tef Poe is one of the co-founders of the Hands Up United movement.

Tef Poe has advocated for grass-roots involvement in improving the lives of African Americans and in racial justice within and outside the United States. In his art and activism, he emphasizes local people taking charge of conversations about their own communities rather than relying on national organizations. In an interview, he said: "And all too often, these conversations are intellectualized and moved completely away from the people who aren't allowed to come into the rooms and intellectualize the different theories surrounding racism. But they did show up in the middle of the street on West Florissant when a militarized police force was encroaching on their neighbors. So many people in pop culture are speaking out now, but they are not speaking in terms of an all-out need for a political revolution in America for Black people."

Tef Poe's work in the Ferguson protests was featured in the documentary Whose Streets?, which premiered at the Sundance Film Festival in 2017 and had a theatrical release marking the third anniversary of the killing of Mike Brown.

Poe has been a fellow at Harvard University in the Charles Warren Center for Studies in American History (2016-2017) and the W. E. B. Du Bois Research Institute, and collaborates with historian Walter Johnson.
