= St. Louis County Jail =

Jail in Missouri, United States

St. Louis County Justice Center
- IUCN category V (protected landscape/seascape)
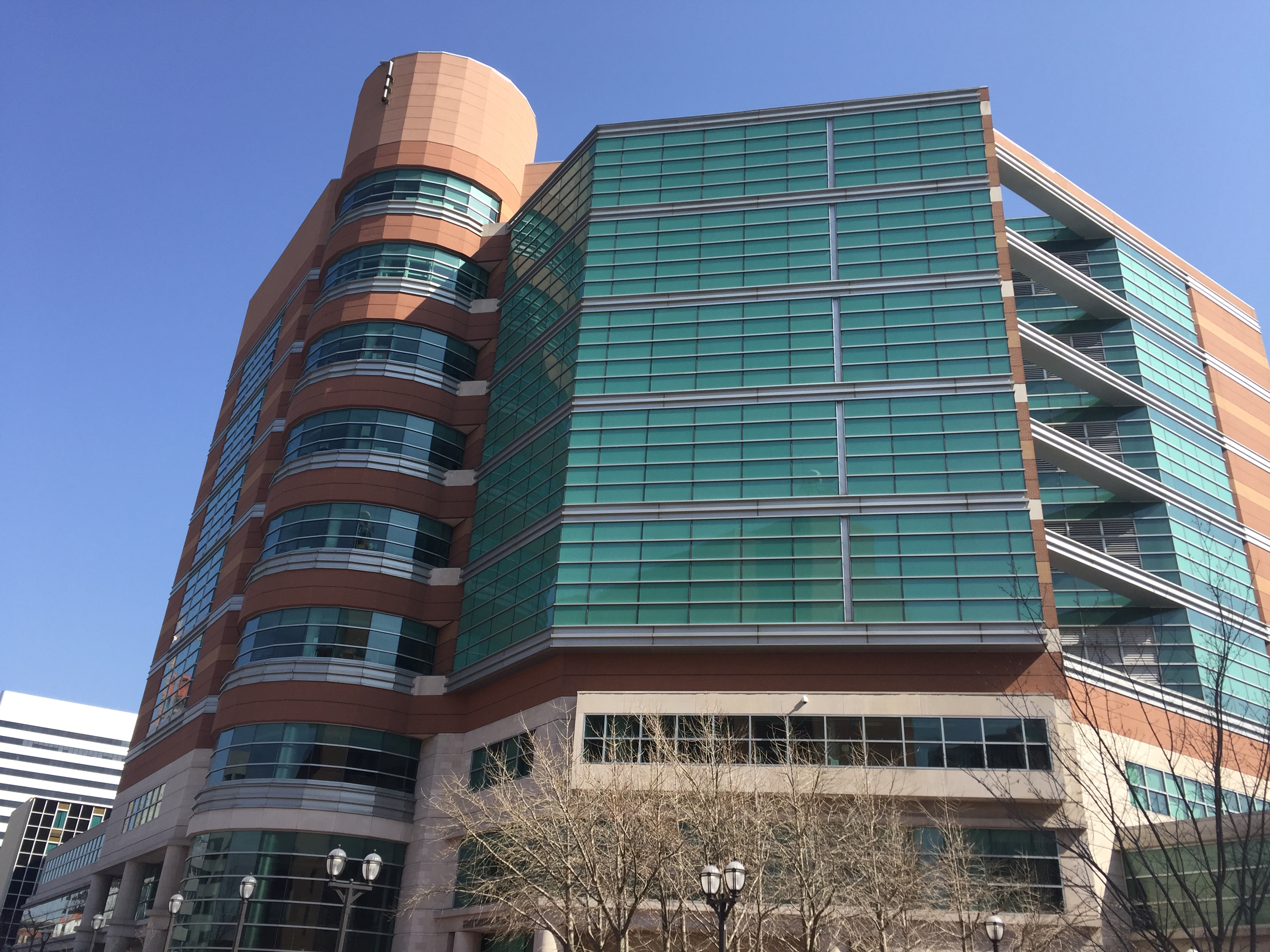
- Buzz Westfall Justice Center, April 2018
- Interactive map of St. Louis County Justice Center
- Location: Clayton, MO, United States
- Nearest city: Saint Louis
- Coordinates: 38°38′56.1618″N 90°20′18.4632″W
- Established: 1998
- Governing body: St. Louis County Department of Justice Services

The St. Louis County Jail is located inside the Buzz Westfall Justice Center in Clayton, Missouri at 100 South Central Avenue, about eight miles (13 km) from downtown St. Louis. The holding capacity of the facility is 1,400 male and female inmates. The St. Louis County Jail is a direct-supervision facility that detains adults and juveniles being tried as adults who are awaiting trial or serving county sentences and is the only jail in Missouri that holds an accreditation known as the ALDF from the American Correctional Association (ACA). Opened in March 1998, the center replaced both the jail in the 1949 St. Louis County Courthouse building and the Adult Correctional Building in Chesterfield, Missouri. The center was rededicated the "Buzz Westfall Justice Center" in 2004.

== History ==
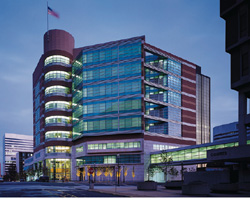
"Buzz Westfall Justice Center", January 2009

St. Louis City and St. Louis County separated in 1876 and left the county at its current size of 524 square miles (1,360 km^{2}). After Clayton, Missouri was chosen as the permanent county seat, a courthouse and jail were built in December 1878. By 1945, a bond issue allowed for the construction of a new courthouse and jail in Clayton facing Forsyth Boulevard that was completed in 1949.

A new state law allowed for jail facilities to be located outside of the county seat of Clayton. Because land costs in Clayton were considered prohibitive, the new Adult Correctional Institution was built in 1969 in Gumbo, a historical community which was located in present-day Chesterfield, Missouri approximately 15 miles (24 km) to the west.

Continued jail overcrowding and deterioration of the remaining jail facilities in Chesterfield created pressure for new correctional facilities. In choosing a site for new facilities the costs and difficulties of continually transporting prisoners between jail facilities in far west County and court facilities in Clayton weighed in favor of a Clayton site for a new jail and expanded court facilities. The new Justice Center (which includes the St. Louis County Jail) opened in 1998 and is connected to the Courts Building by a secure skywalk, replacing both the jail in the 1949 Courthouse building and the Adult Correctional Building in Chesterfield. The justice center was rededicated the "Buzz Westfall Justice Center" in 2004. George "Buzz" Westfall was the St. Louis County Executive from 1990 to October 2003 when he died after developing a staph infection.

== Physical description ==
The jail has a total of 960 cells, with a capacity for 1,400 inmates, in overcrowded conditions. The Justice Center has nine levels, though some of those floors serve the jail administration, Prosecutors office, Public Defenders office, County Police Fingerprint Unit, Fugitive section and some Public Works offices. Each floor that houses inmates has a capacity of 301 inmates. Furthermore, each floor of the jail is divided into four units with 48 cells in each unit.

The cells in St. Louis County Jail do not have bars, instead the floor plan is laid out in a dormitory fashion. At the front of the housing unit, referred to as a "pod", there is a sally port door, with an inner and outer door. The outer door is controlled by a permanent staff member who men a desk in the convergence area of the floor. The inner sally port is controlled by the housing unit officer. Once through the doors, the room opens up into a double tiered great-room. Near the sally port is the table area where inmates may use their rec time to play games. It also serves as their dining location. Beyond that is a TV area lined with plastic recliners. The inmates are provided with two flat-screen TV's to watch any number of channels provided to them. Near the rear of the pod is the officer's podium; a cinder block half-wall with a desk embedded into it. The officer must never be far from the podium, as it contains their computer and the control panel which unlocks the doors in the pod.

== Direct supervision ==
The St. Louis County Jail uses a direct-supervision management philosophy in the main inmate housing areas. This style, unlike the traditional linear jail style, places correction officers directly within the inmate living units and provides the officers with immediate visual observation and continual interaction with the inmates. It also places the officer in a more vulnerable position, as the inmates are allowed nearly unrestricted access to the officer. All officers are issued pepper spray to carry on their person while in the housing unit. They are also issued a Personal Duress Alarm, which immediately sounds an alarm in the master control unit. A call is then made via radio to all available units to assist the officer in distress. Response times as well as the number of staff responding varies, as there is usually no more than 2 extra officers per floor and a maximum of 4 operating internal elevators.

== Visitation policy ==
Inmates are allowed up to two visits within any continuous seven-day period, and no more than one visit per day. Visiting hours run from 10:00 am through 8:00 pm Monday through Sunday. Visiting periods are forty minutes long and begin promptly on the hour. Due to space limitations, an acceptable combination of visitors may include: two adults; two adults and one child; or one adult and two children. Low-cut blouses, mini-skirts, short shorts and transparent or sheer clothing are strictly prohibited. Male visitors must wear shirts with sleeves. No "muscle shirts" are allowed.

STL County offers CHOICES and AA. The jail also offers GED classes and testing, as well as religious services of varying denominations.

== General statistics and facts ==
- Total of 960 cells
- Holding capacity: 1400 inmates
- Capacity per floor: 301 inmates
- Average age: 32
- Average daily population: 1,150
- Average arrestees per year: 31,560
- Jail cells do not have bars
- Each housing floor has four units, with 48 cells to each unit. Each unit holds 72 inmates.
- The Justice Center has 14 levels. (Floors four through eight are two stories in height each, but internally counted as one.)
- Approximately 1.4 million meals are prepared each year for inmates by food service staff
- An Electronic Home Detention (EHD) program started in 2006, replacing the Work Release Center that closed due to budgetary constraints.
- National Geographic filmed an episode of "Lockdown: County Jail" (July, 2009).

== Dilapidated Conditions, Rioting, and Detainee Deaths ==
The St. Louis County Jail has faced accusations in recent years over the conditions of the facility, treatment of detainees, and resulting deaths. The jail has struggled to maintain standards of sanitation and storage. The American Correctional Association that is responsible for the inspection of jails found the facility to be negligent in food handling and cleanliness. As a result, the jail lost its accreditation. An audit conducted in 2025 revealed that the jail was overcrowded with detainees and understaffed in high administrative positions, with a consistent turnover rate. There was evidence collected of the kitchen being dirty, contaminated food, moldy showers, and filthy living areas. After tensions built regarding reduced recreational technology time and being withheld in their cells longer than normal, a riot broke out at the facility on February 7, 2026. The riot began with thirty-four inmates and ended with the destruction of many technological equipment, resulting in $30,804 in damages. It resulted in a decision by the director over the jail to provide more on-the-job training to guards in the near future. In 2019, there were five deaths at the jail; two of the deaths were a direct result of medical issues but were indirectly caused by neglect on behalf of the staff and others. On February 23, John M. Shy died of an intestinal hemorrhage after having been transferred to St. Mary's Hospital twice, only to be sent away by medical staff. He later bled to death in his cell in full view of two nurses. On March 1, Lamar Catchings died of acute Leukemia after his condition had suddenly worsened in the preceding two weeks. His requests for medical assistance had been ignored as had his physical symptoms. The St. Louis County Prosecuting Attorney, Wesley Bell, decided that no one would be prosecuted in either case.

== Notable Inmates ==
- Michael J. Devlin, kidnapper
- Gary Kaplan, sport better
- Maury Travis, serial killer
