= Crooks and Liars =

American progressive political blog

- Website type: News blog
- Available in: English
- Creator: John Amato
- Editor: John Amato
- Website: crooksandliars.com
- Commercial: Yes
- Launched: September 2004; 22 years ago

Crooks and Liars is an anti-fake-news, progressive political news blog founded by John Amato. The website has been described as hyperpartisan.

== History ==
Crooks and Liars, a self-described liberal political blog, was started by John Amato in September 2004. Amato, known as the "Vlogfather," was a pioneer of video blogging, which he turned to after an injury undermined his saxophone career during a hiatus from a reunion tour with Duran Duran. Amato said he started the site "because he thought that mainstream media wasn't critical enough of the Bush Administration, and he felt motivated to speak out".

In 2009, the site's coverage of CNN catching a falsehood in Fox News' coverage of Bill O'Reilly was highlighted by The Hill, as was its writeup about six potential President Barack Obama Supreme Court justice nominees, former House Speaker Newt Gingrich's attacks on Obama, critiques of Obama "appeasing" House Republicans, criticism of President Obama's surrogates, the 2009 Republican Party leader's focus on supporting gay marriage and the site's 2009 donation drive.

In 2021, Crooks and Liars helped expose President Donald Trump's supporters' efforts to cast doubt on the results of the 2020 election. According to The New Yorker, the site "dug up tax filings" that exposed connections between nonprofits and a chairman of the Federalist Society who opposed efforts to make it easier to vote.

== Influence, recognition, and content ==
Crooks and Liars received the "Best Video Blog" award at the Weblog Awards in 2006, and a "Best Weblog About Politics" at the 2008 Weblog Awards. Time magazine listed Crooks and Liars as one of the 25 Best Blogs of 2009. In 2010, Crooks and Liars' content was featured by New York magazine's Intelligencer. A 2011 study in Journalism included Crooks and Liars in a list of the "12 most popular partisan blogs."

A 2017 study by Harvard University's Berkman Klein Center found that Crooks and Liars was among the 50 websites whose content was most frequently shared on Twitter by supporters of Hillary Clinton in the United States presidential election, 2016.

In 2016, Indiana University Kokomo professor Paul Cook included Crooks and Liars in a list of sites with a "tendency to rely on clickbait headlines". The same year, Melissa Zimdars, an assistant professor of media at Merrimack College, identified Crooks and Liars as one of several news websites with "a baiting or heavily biased tone". A 2019 study identified Crooks and Liars as a "biased source".

The Oxford Internet Institute identifies Crooks and Liars as a "junk news" source.

A 2019 study published in the Proceedings of the National Academy of Sciences found that self-identified Democrats trusted Fox News more than Crooks and Liars. The same study classified Crooks and Liars as a hyperpartisan source.

Jane Mayer, writing in The New Yorker, described Crooks and Liars as a "progressive investigative reporting site."
