= Organization for Black Struggle =

St. Louis, Missouri-based activist organization

- Abbreviation: OBS
- Formation: 1980; 46 years ago
- Purpose: activism
- Location: St. Louis, Missouri
- Region served: United States
- Chair: Montague Simmons
- Affiliations: Hands Up United
- Website: www.obs-stl.org

Organization for Black Struggle is a St. Louis, Missouri-based activist organization founded in 1980. The organization seeks "political empowerment, economic justice and the cultural dignity of the African-American community, especially the Black working class." Organization for Black Struggle gained national attention when it joined with other organizations to publicly seek justice in the shooting of Michael Brown by a police officer on 2014.

In 2010, Montague Simmons became the chair of Organization for Black Struggle.

The organization was active in protests in Ferguson and St. Louis, Missouri, following to police shootings of Michael Brown and Vonderrit Myers Jr. in 2014.
