= 2020 Democratic Party vice presidential candidate selection =

2020 Democratic vice presidential nomination
- August 11, 2020
Nominee	Kamala Harris
Home state	California
Previous Vice Presidential nominee
Tim Kaine
Vice Presidential nominee
Kamala Harris

This article lists the candidates for the Democratic nomination for Vice President of the United States in the 2020 presidential election. Former Vice President Joe Biden of Delaware, the 2020 Democratic nominee for President of the United States, considered several prominent Democrats and other individuals before selecting Senator Kamala Harris of California as his running mate on August 11, 2020. Harris formally won the vice presidential nomination on August 19, 2020, at the 2020 Democratic National Convention. The Biden–Harris campaign would go on to defeat the Republican incumbents Trump–Pence in the general election.

In March 2020, Biden promised to select a woman as his running mate, which marked the third time that the vice presidential nominee of a major party in the United States has been a woman, after Geraldine Ferraro in 1984 and Sarah Palin in 2008.

Harris was the first woman, Asian American, and African American elected to the vice presidency, and the first multiracial person elected to the vice presidency since Charles Curtis in 1928. Upon Biden's inauguration in January 2021, she became vice president of the United States, making her the highest-ranking woman and Asian American in the U.S. history, whereas her husband Doug Emhoff became the first second gentleman in the U.S. history. She would go on to become the Democratic presidential nominee in 2024 after Biden withdrew his bid from re-election, but ultimately lost to former President Donald Trump in the general election.

== Selection process ==
At the March 15, 2020, Democratic primary debate between former Vice President Joe Biden and Senator Bernie Sanders of Vermont, Biden committed to selecting a woman as his running mate. At that same debate, Sanders stated that he would likely do the same, but did not pledge to do so. Biden became the presumptive presidential nominee after Sanders dropped out on April 8, though the Democratic ticket would not be officially nominated until the 2020 Democratic National Convention in August 2020. With his pledge, his running mate became the third woman to be the vice presidential nominee of a major party in United States history, following Democrat Geraldine Ferraro in 1984 and Republican Sarah Palin in 2008.

Biden indicated that he would make his selection on the basis of shared political beliefs and past experience. He noted that his selection would likely be younger than he is and that he would likely pick someone who is "ready on Day 1 to be president." On April 30, it was announced that the vetting committee would consist of Lisa Blunt Rochester, Chris Dodd, Eric Garcetti, and Cynthia Hogan.

== Announcement ==
Biden had initially planned to make his announcement regarding his running mate selection "around" August 1. The announcement date was later pushed back to the second week in August. On August 11, it was reported that Biden had selected his running mate and an announcement was imminent.

Later that day, Kamala Harris was revealed as Biden's vice presidential running mate. Harris was the junior U.S. senator from California, first elected in 2016. She additionally has experience as the Attorney General of California, San Francisco District Attorney, and as a prosecutor. Harris was a candidate in the 2020 Democratic Party presidential primaries, before suspending her campaign in December 2019, later endorsing Biden's campaign in March 2020. Harris was the third woman vice presidential running mate of a major party and the first Asian American. Harris additionally is the first Democrat from the Western United States to appear on a presidential ticket; Barack Obama was born in Hawaii, a Western state, but was nominated as a representative of Illinois.

== Vetting process ==
=== Finalists ===
On August 13, The New York Times reported the four finalists were Kamala Harris, Susan Rice, Elizabeth Warren, and Gretchen Whitmer.

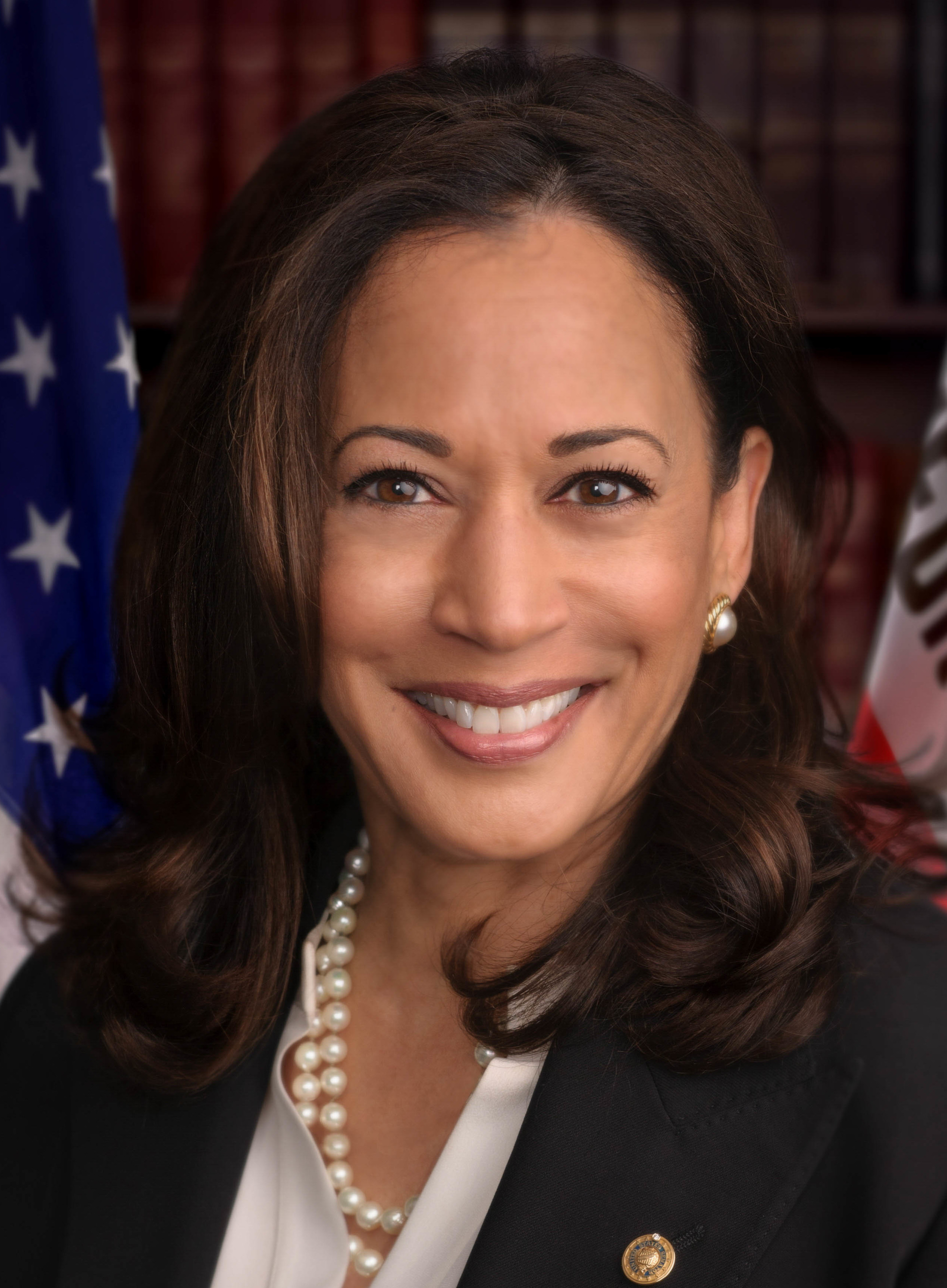
Senator and 2020 presidential candidate
Kamala Harris
from California
(2017–2021)

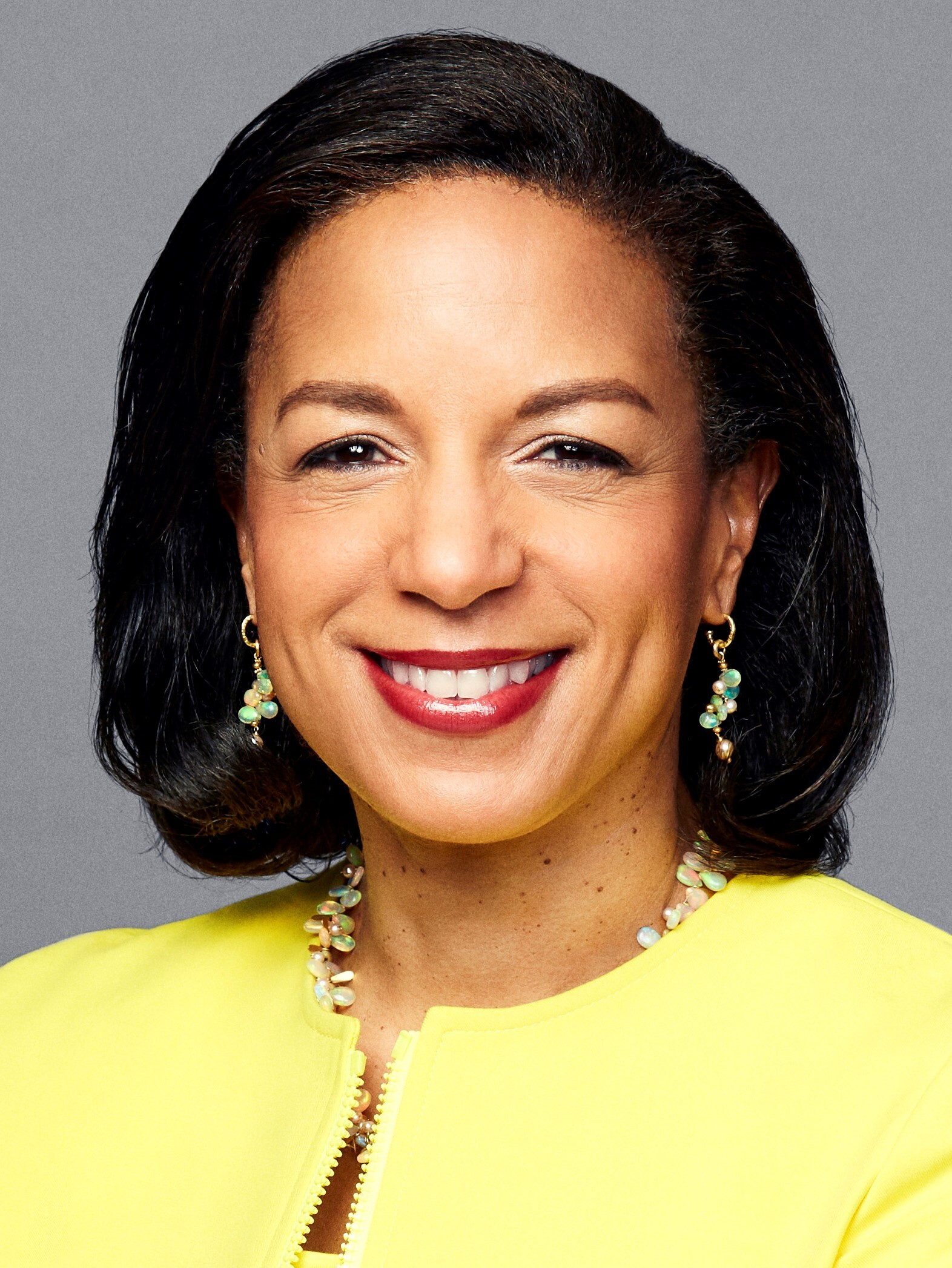
Former National Security Advisor
Susan Rice
from Washington, D.C.
(2013–2017)

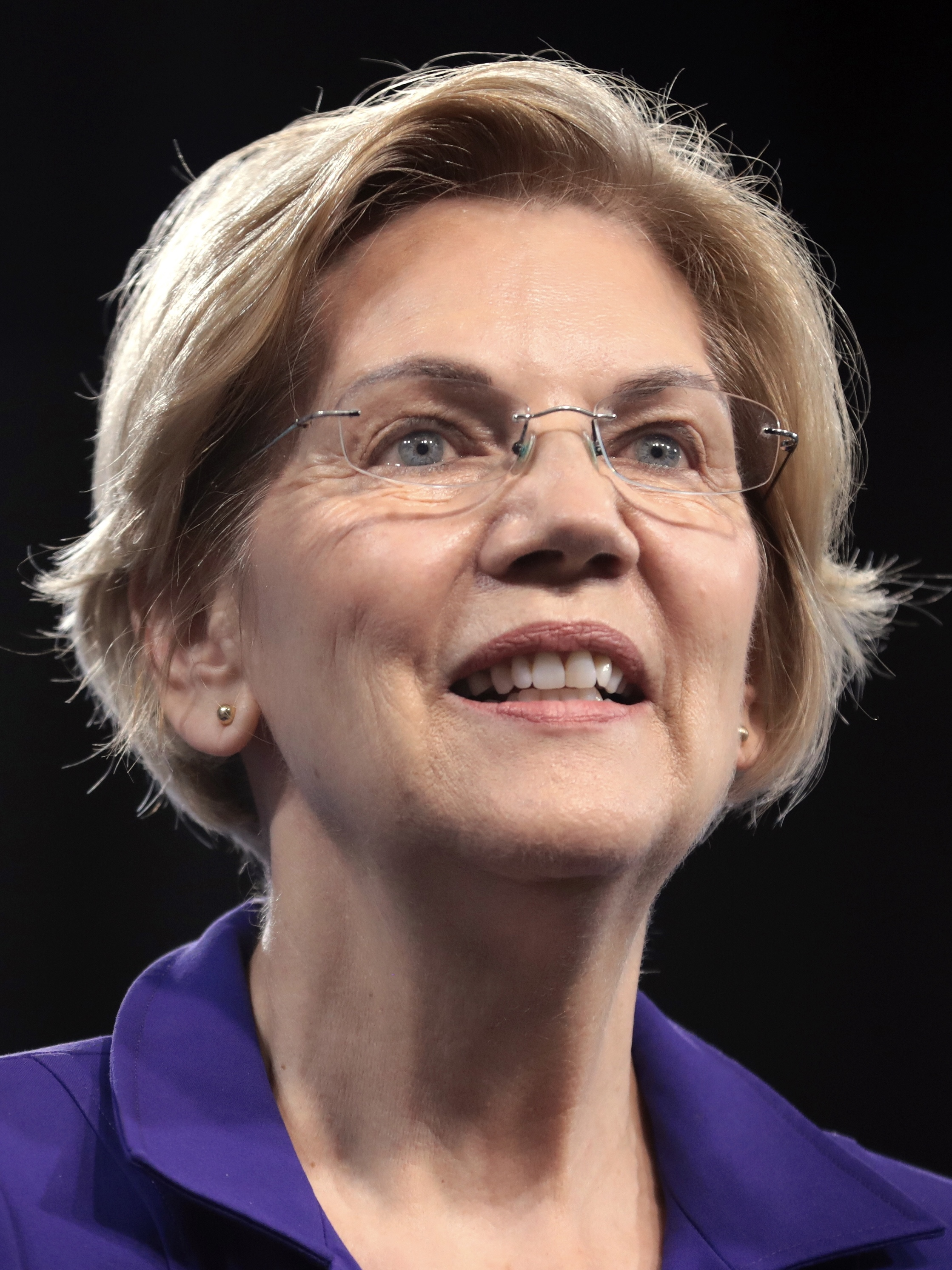
Senator and 2020 presidential candidate
Elizabeth Warren
from Massachusetts
(2013–present)

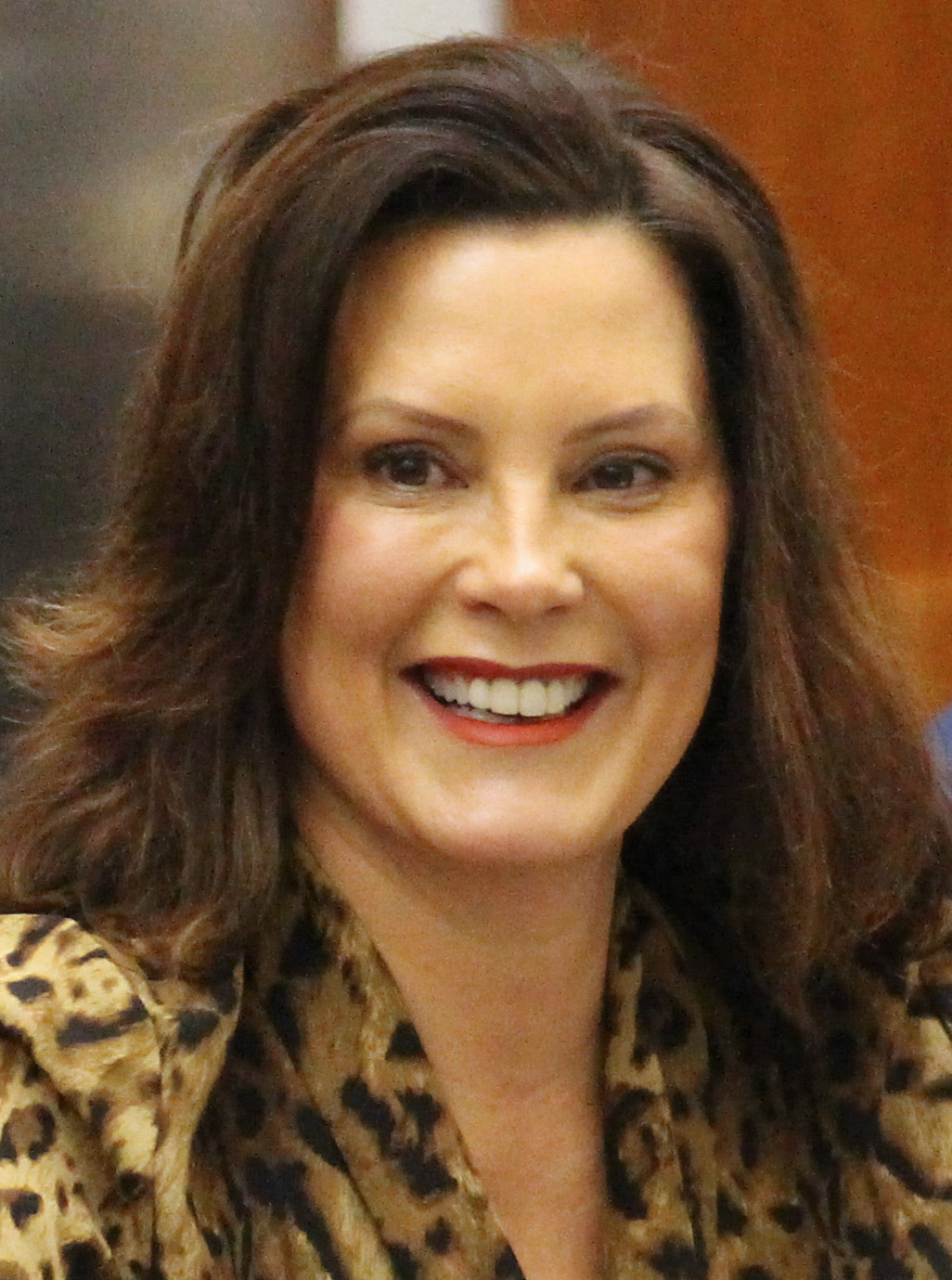
Governor
Gretchen Whitmer
of Michigan
(2019–present)

=== Shortlist ===
The Biden campaign was reported to have begun the vetting process of potential running mates in May 2020. The following officials were reported to have undergone vetting by the Biden campaign. However, following the George Floyd protests, Amy Klobuchar was criticized for her lack of prosecution of police misconduct during her tenure as Hennepin County County Attorney, including a case involving the officer who murdered Floyd. On June 18, she announced that she had removed herself from consideration and urged for Biden to select a woman of color.

On June 12, the Associated Press reported that Keisha Lance Bottoms, Val Demings, Kamala Harris, Michelle Lujan Grisham, Susan Rice, and Elizabeth Warren had advanced to further stages in the vetting process, with the possibility that some other vetted candidates had as well. On June 26, CNN reported that Bottoms, Demings, Harris, and Warren were at that point the leading candidates for the nomination.

On July 29, just a week before Biden's initially planned announcement, The Hill reported that Karen Bass, Harris, Rice, and Warren had emerged as the "top tier" of candidates. On August 2, CNN reported that Tammy Duckworth and Gretchen Whitmer were also still under consideration. On August 10, The New York Times reported that Biden's running mate committee had finished interviewing the possible candidates and that an announcement was "imminent".

In addition to the four finalists, the following individuals were reported to be on Biden's shortlist.

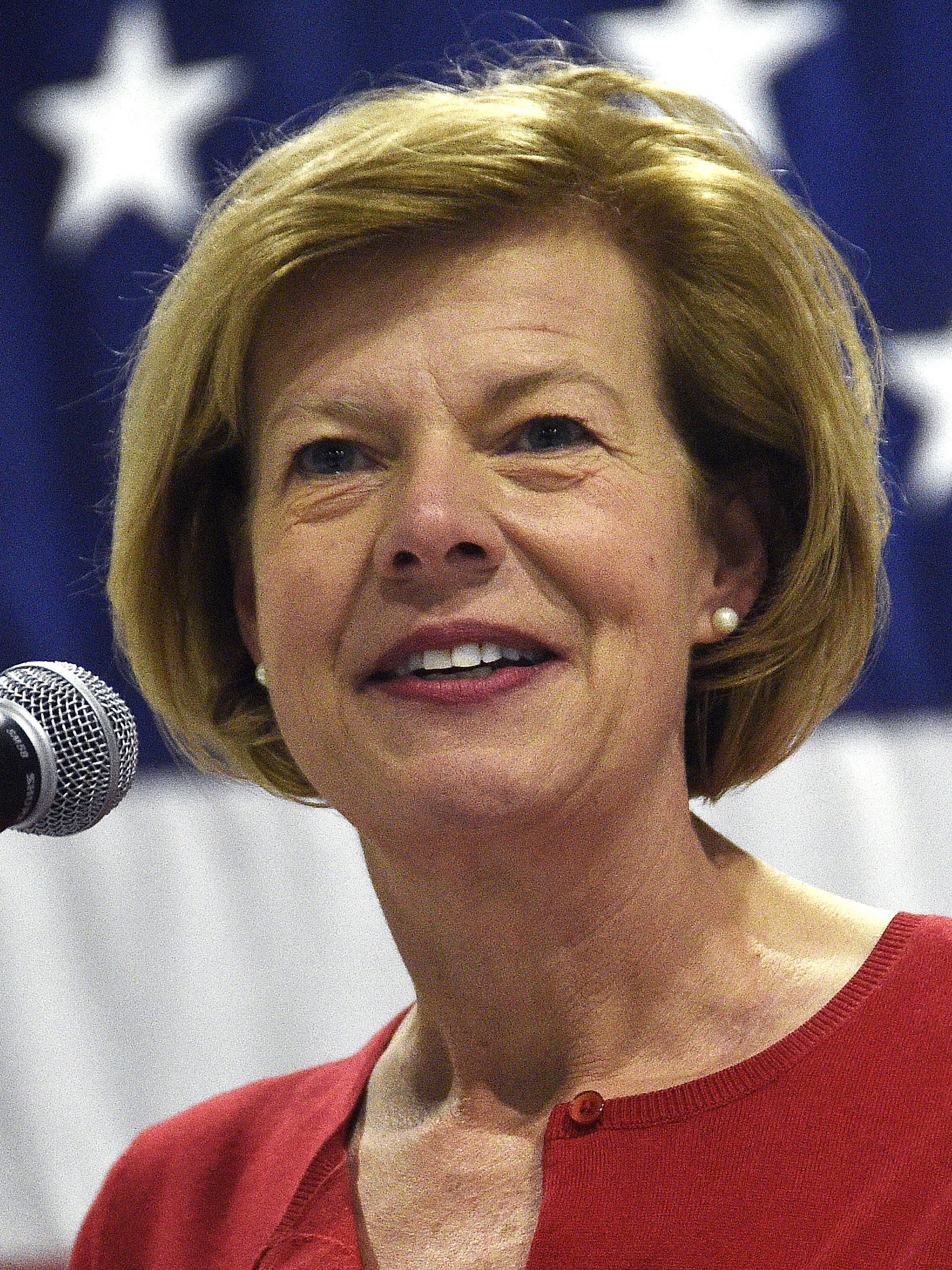
Senator
Tammy Baldwin
from Wisconsin
(2013–present)

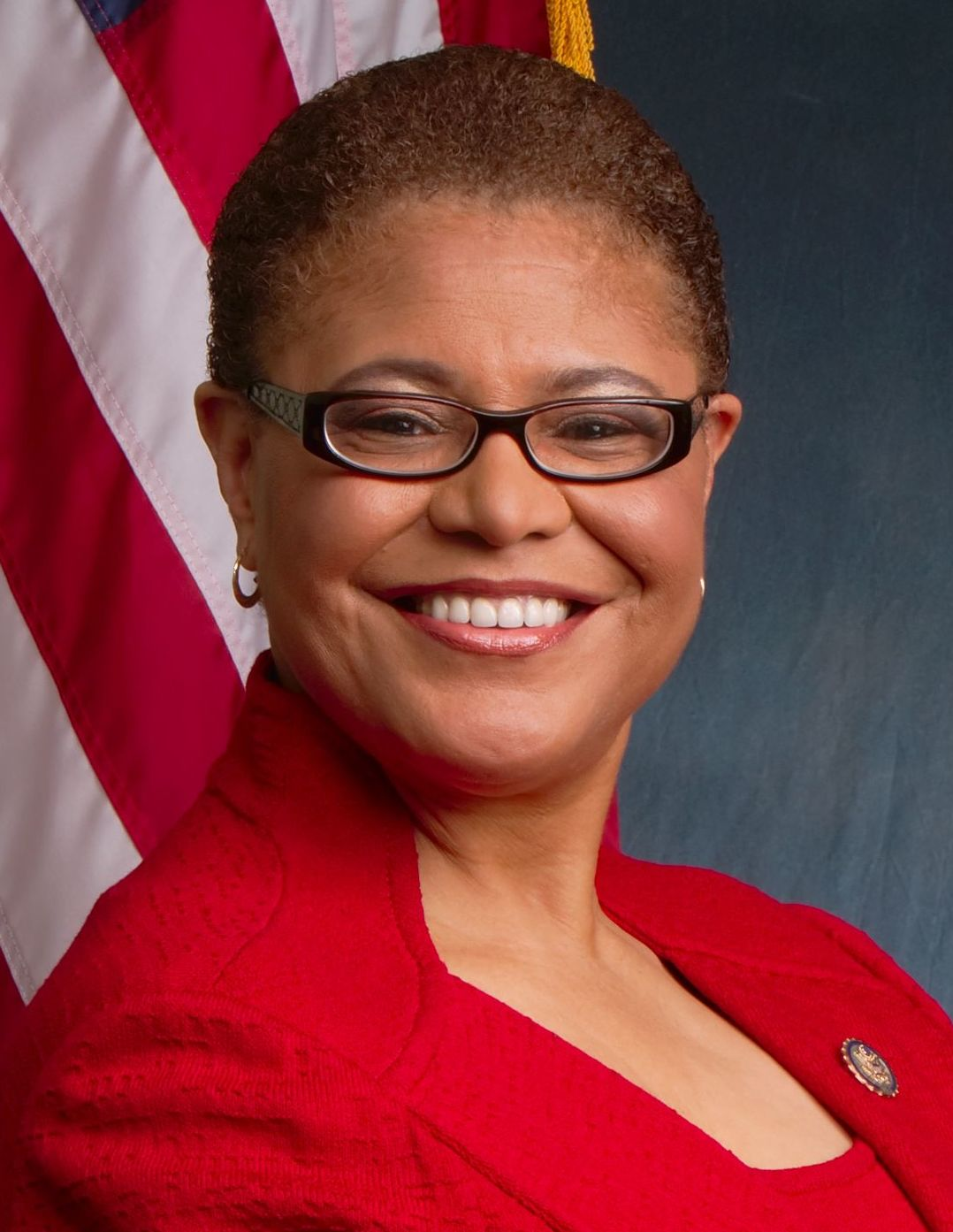
Representative
Karen Bass
from California
(2011–2022)

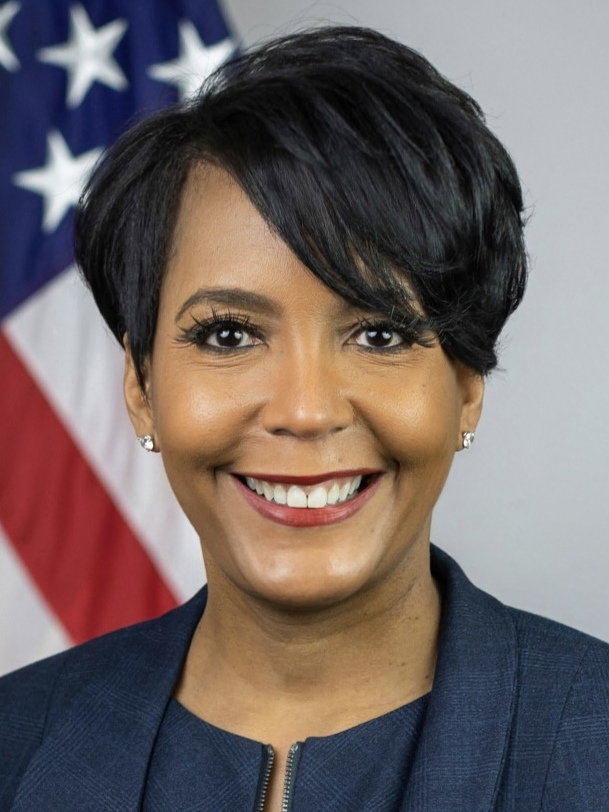
Mayor of Atlanta
Keisha Lance Bottoms
from Georgia
(2018–2022)

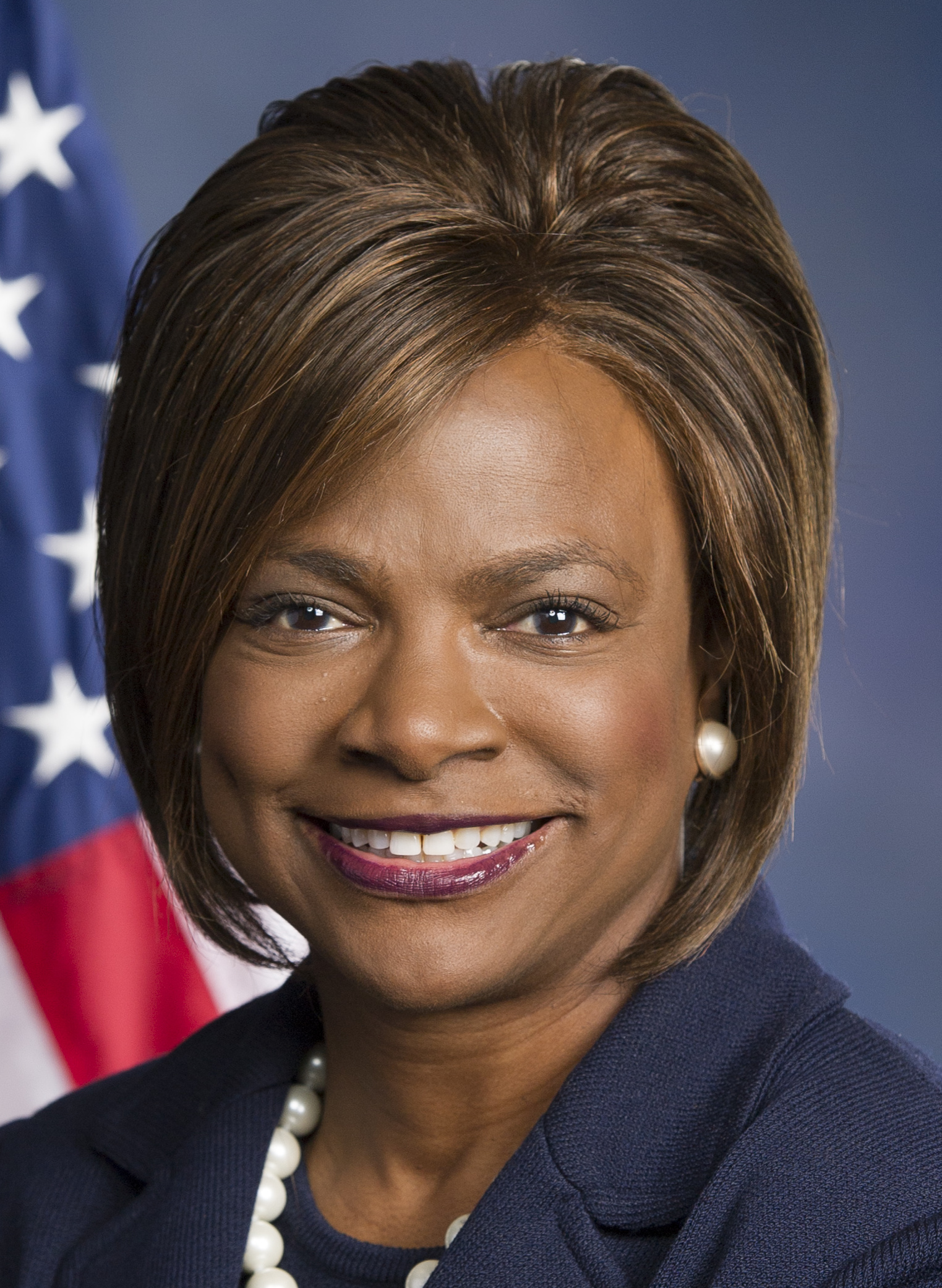
Representative
Val Demings
from Florida
(2017–2023)

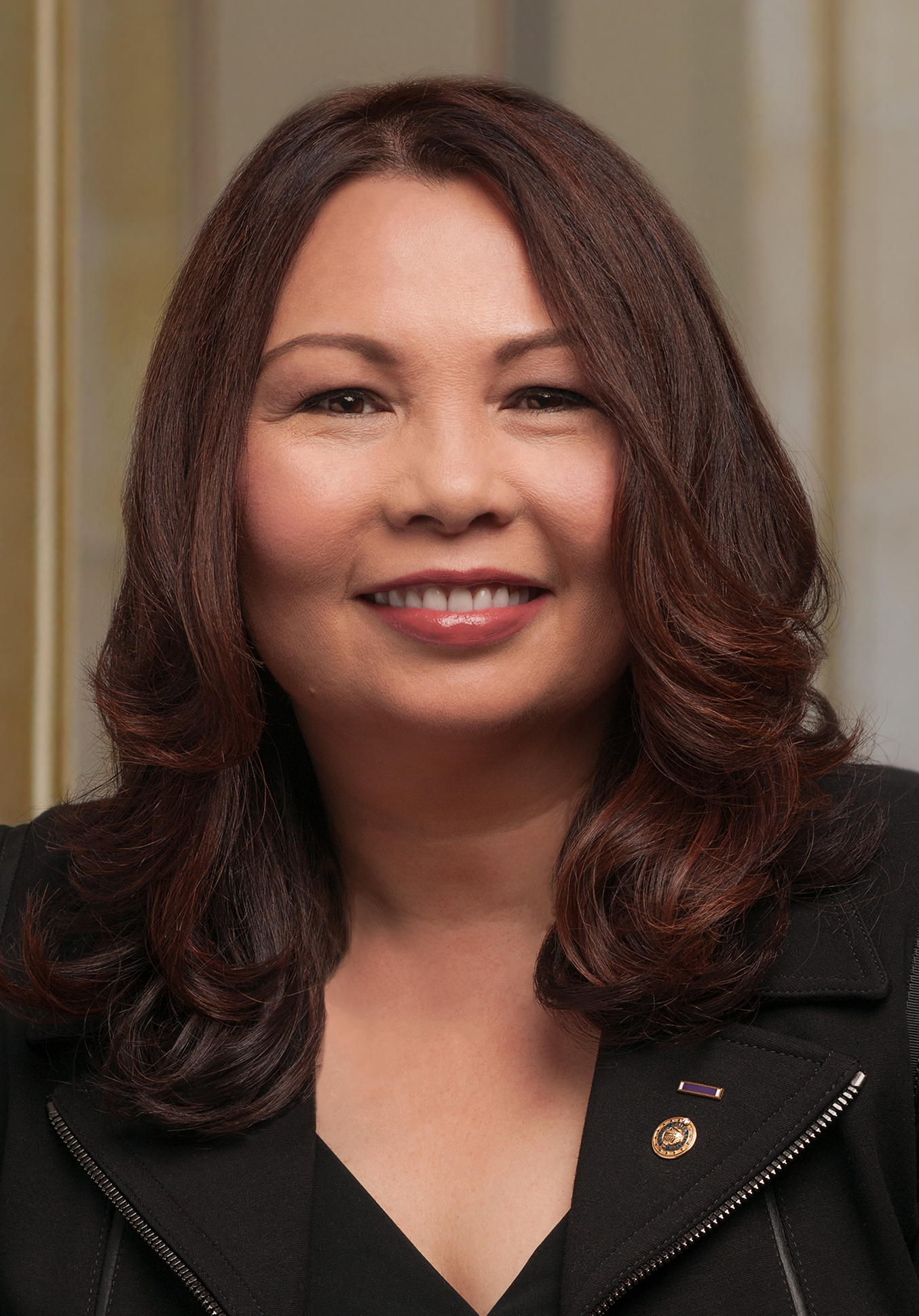
Senator
Tammy Duckworth
from Illinois
(2017–present)

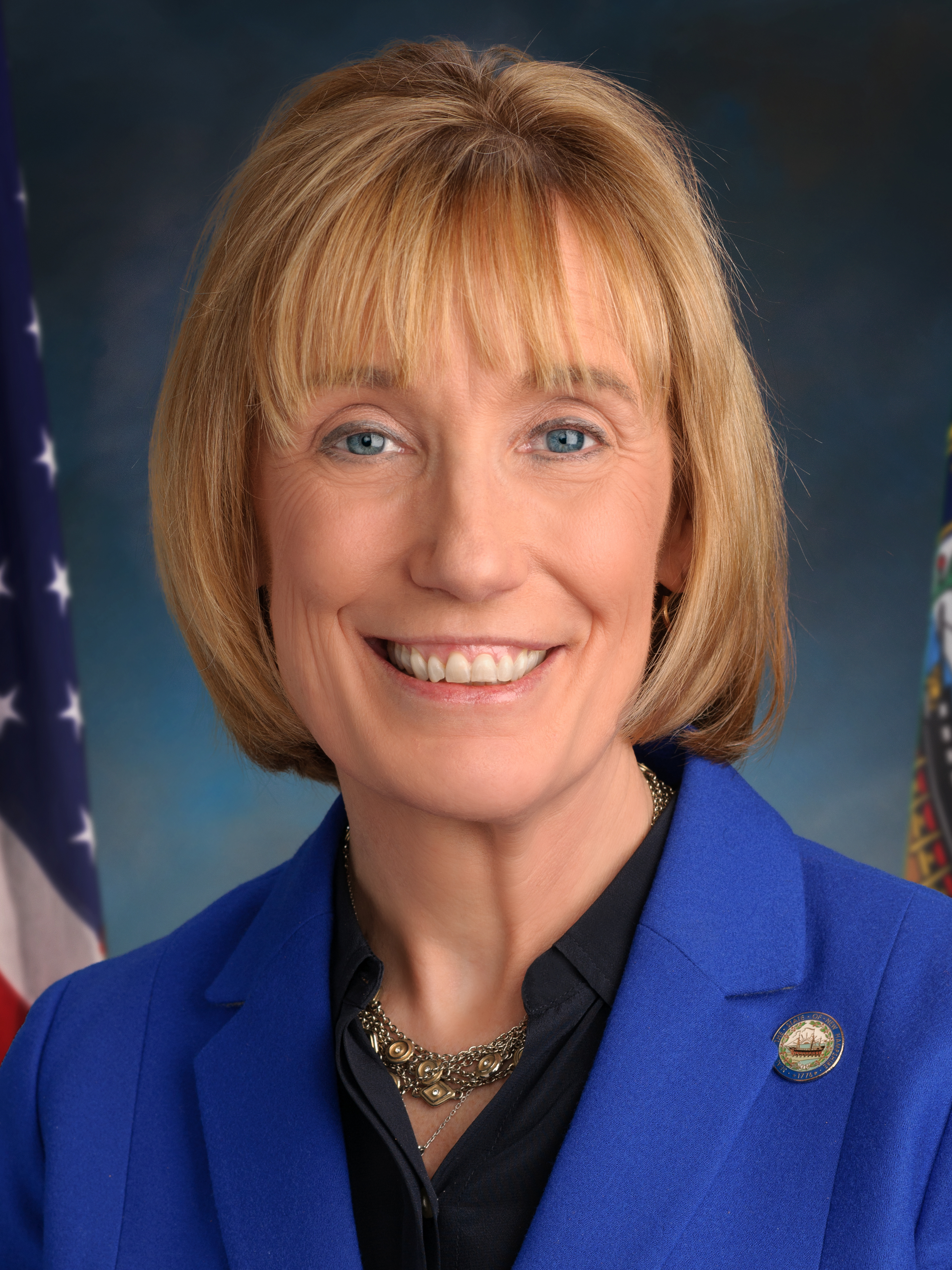
Senator
Maggie Hassan
from New Hampshire
(2017–present)

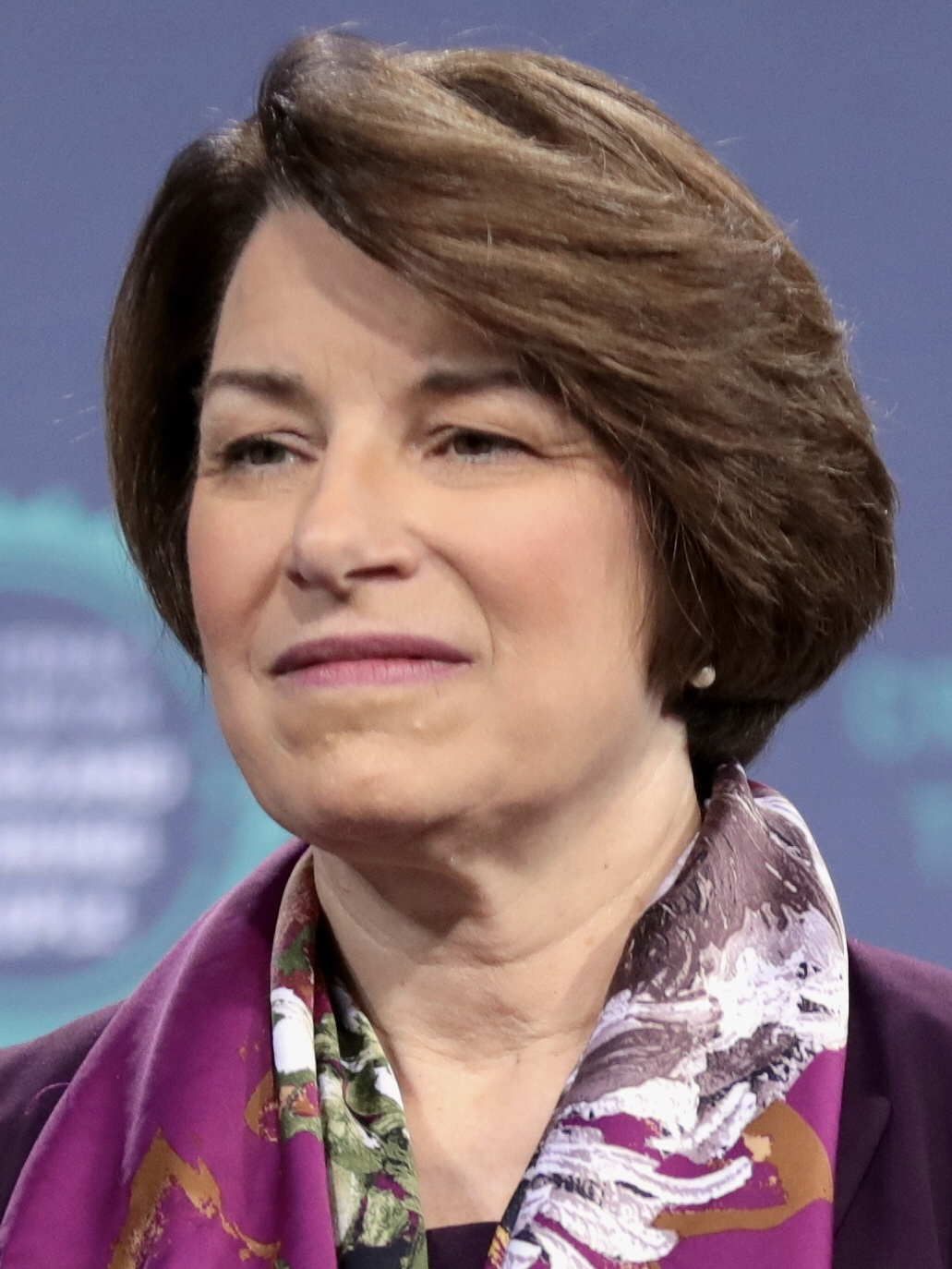
Senator and 2020 presidential candidate
Amy Klobuchar
from Minnesota
(2007–present) (withdrew)

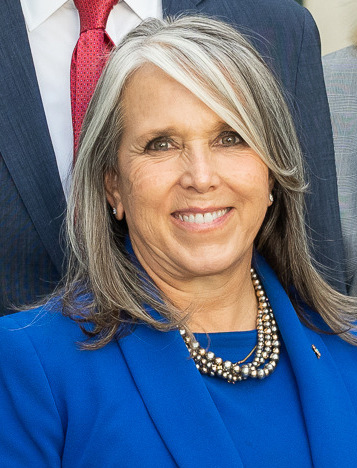
Governor
Michelle Lujan Grisham
of New Mexico
(2019–present)

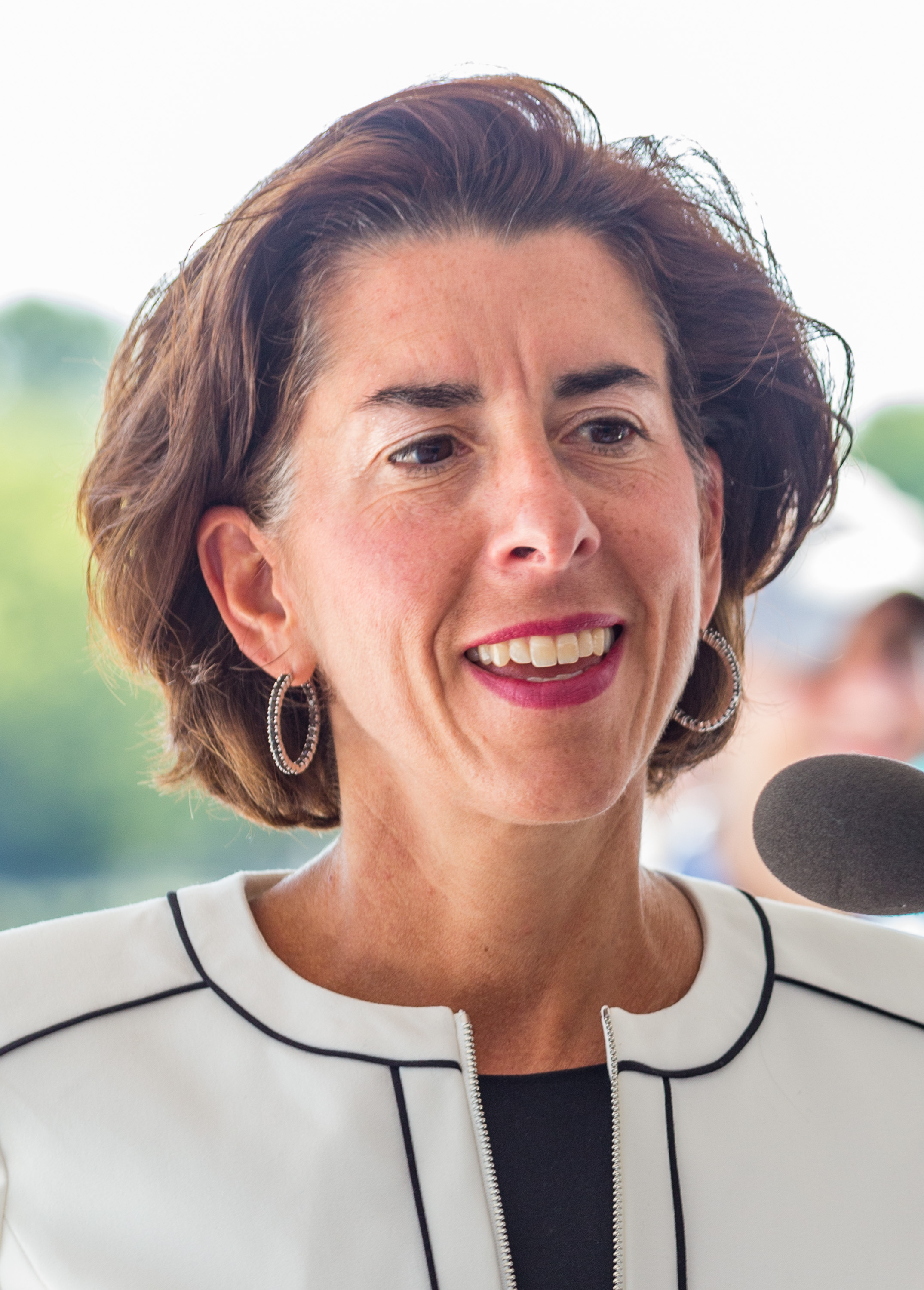
Governor
Gina Raimondo
of Rhode Island
(2015–2021)

== Declined to be considered ==
The following individuals publicly confirmed that they had declined to be vetted by the Biden campaign.

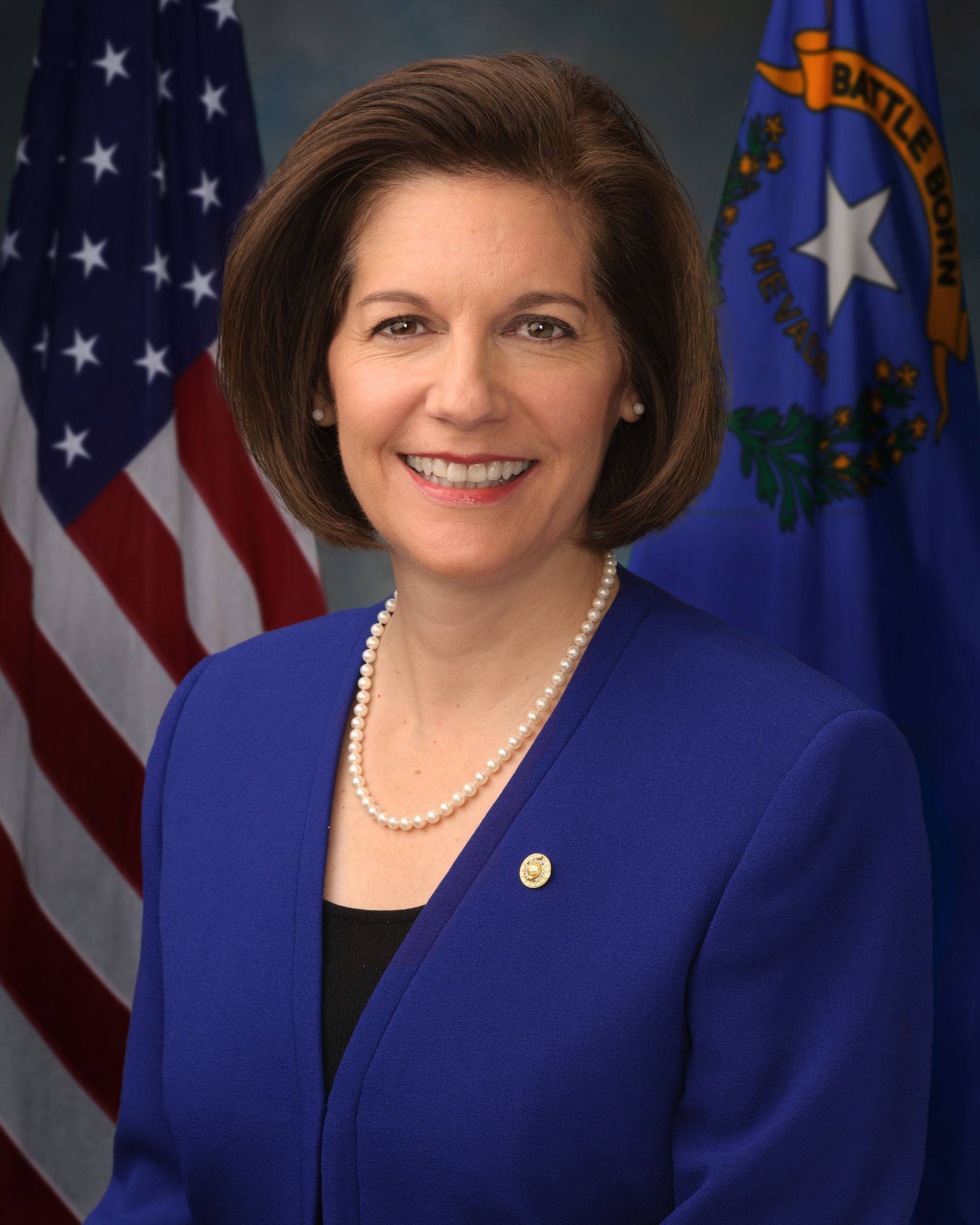
Senator
Catherine Cortez Masto
from Nevada
(2017–present)

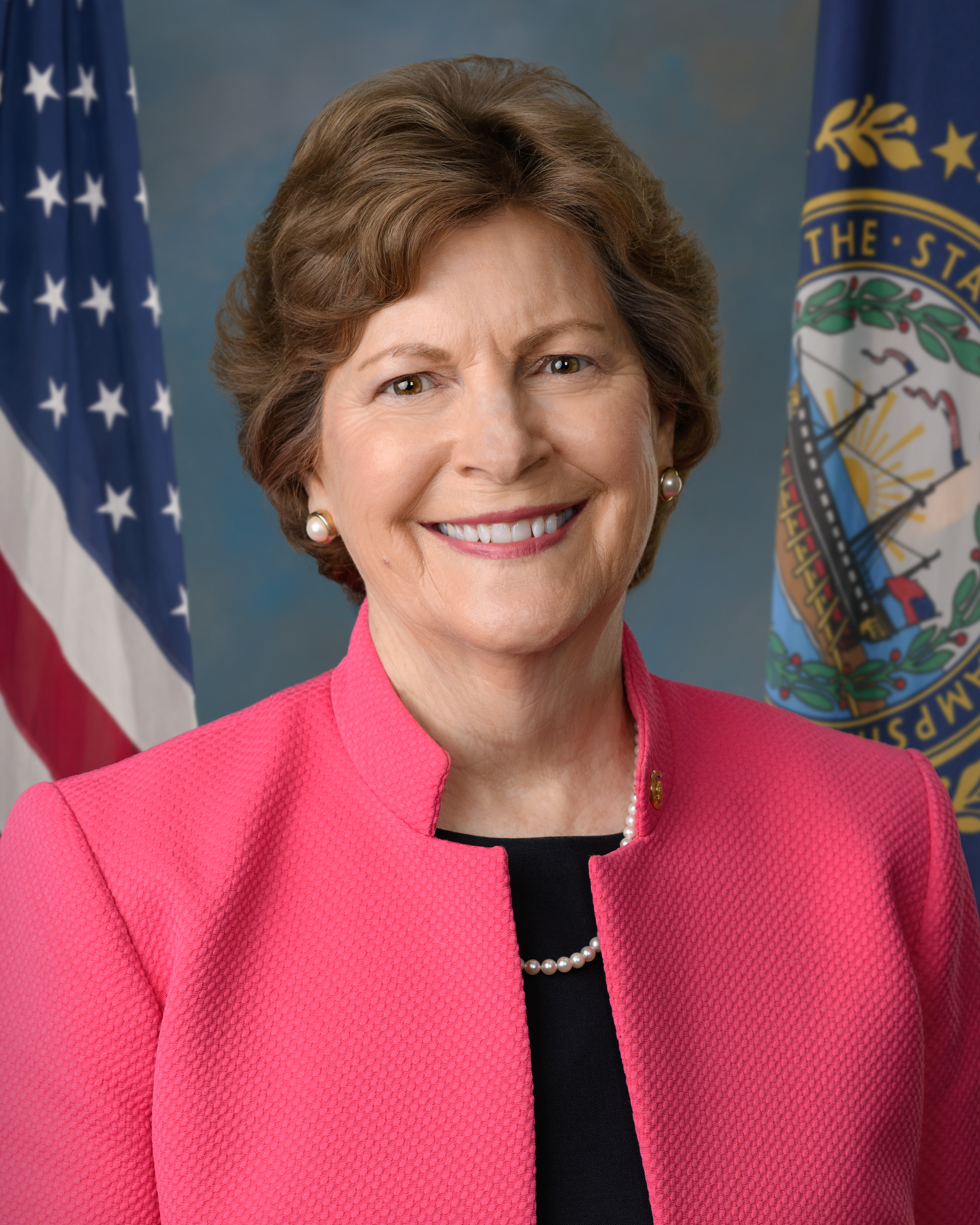
Senator
Jeanne Shaheen
from New Hampshire
(2009–present)

== Media speculation about other potential running mates ==
The following individuals received coverage as potential running mates from multiple news sources, but were not reported to have been asked to undergo vetting by the Biden campaign.

=== Federal executive branch officials ===
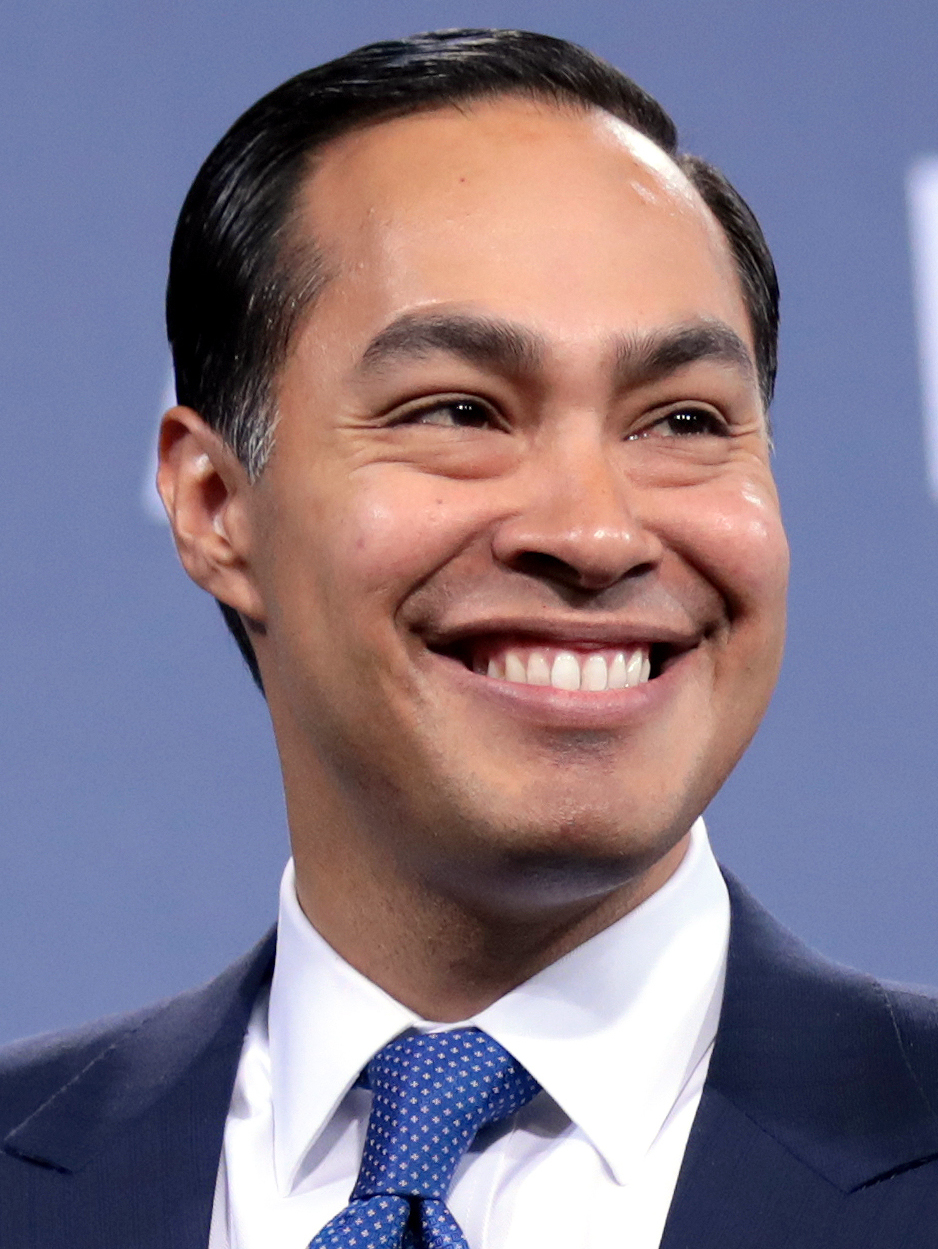
Former HUD Secretary and 2020 presidential candidate
Julian Castro
from Texas
(2014–2017)

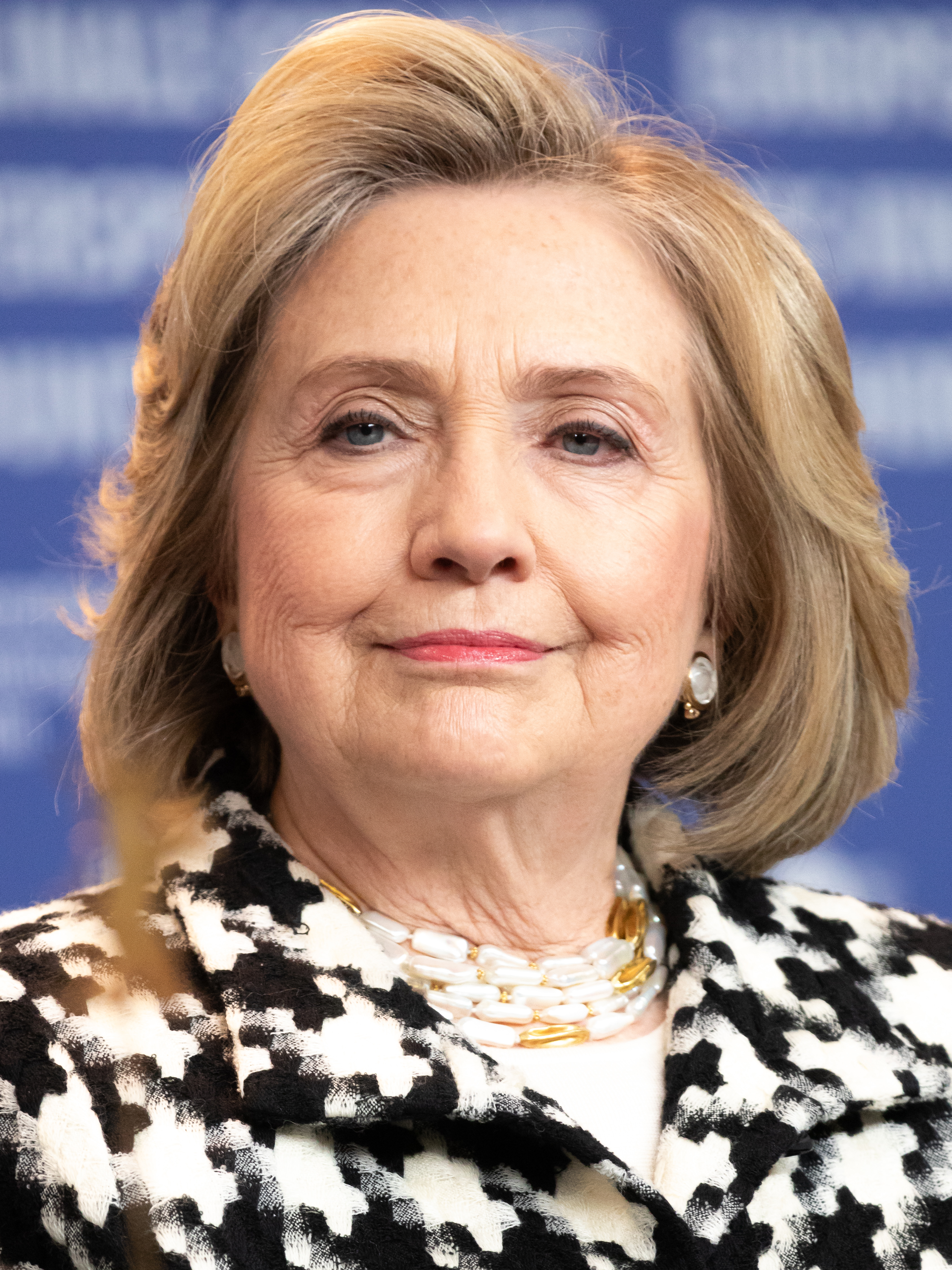
Former Secretary of State and 2016 presidential nominee
Hillary Clinton
from New York
(2009–2013)

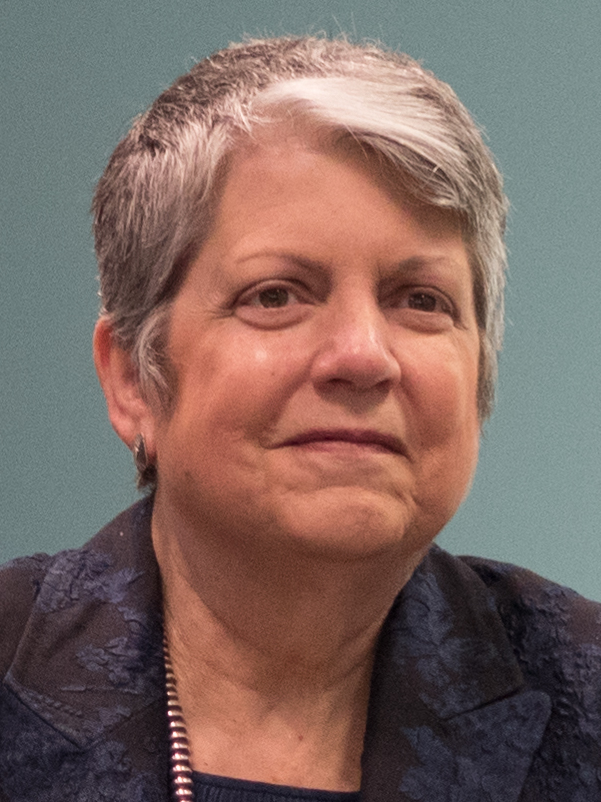
Former Secretary of Homeland Security
Janet Napolitano
from Arizona
(2009–2013)

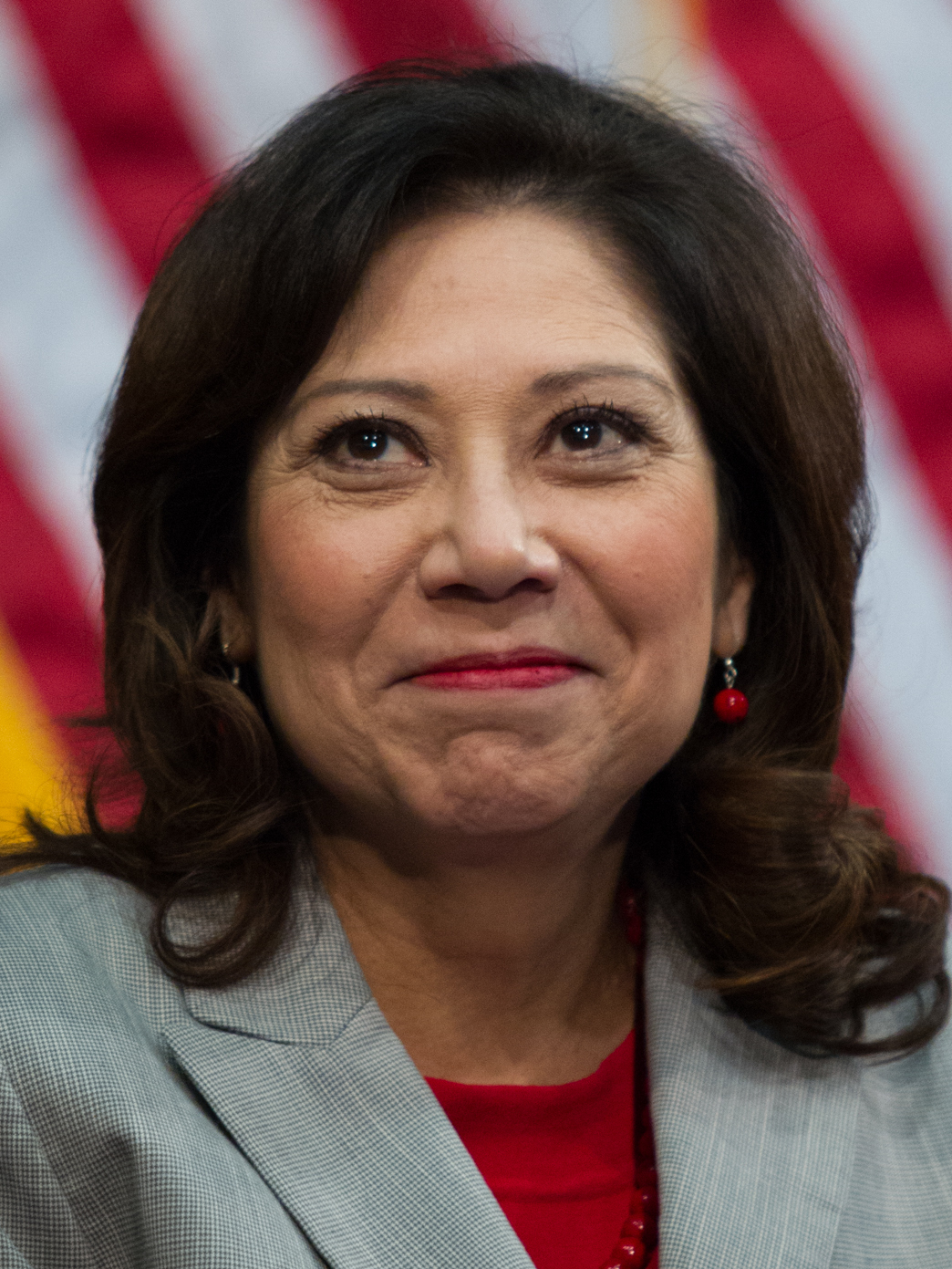
Former Secretary of Labor
Hilda Solis
from California
(2009–2013)

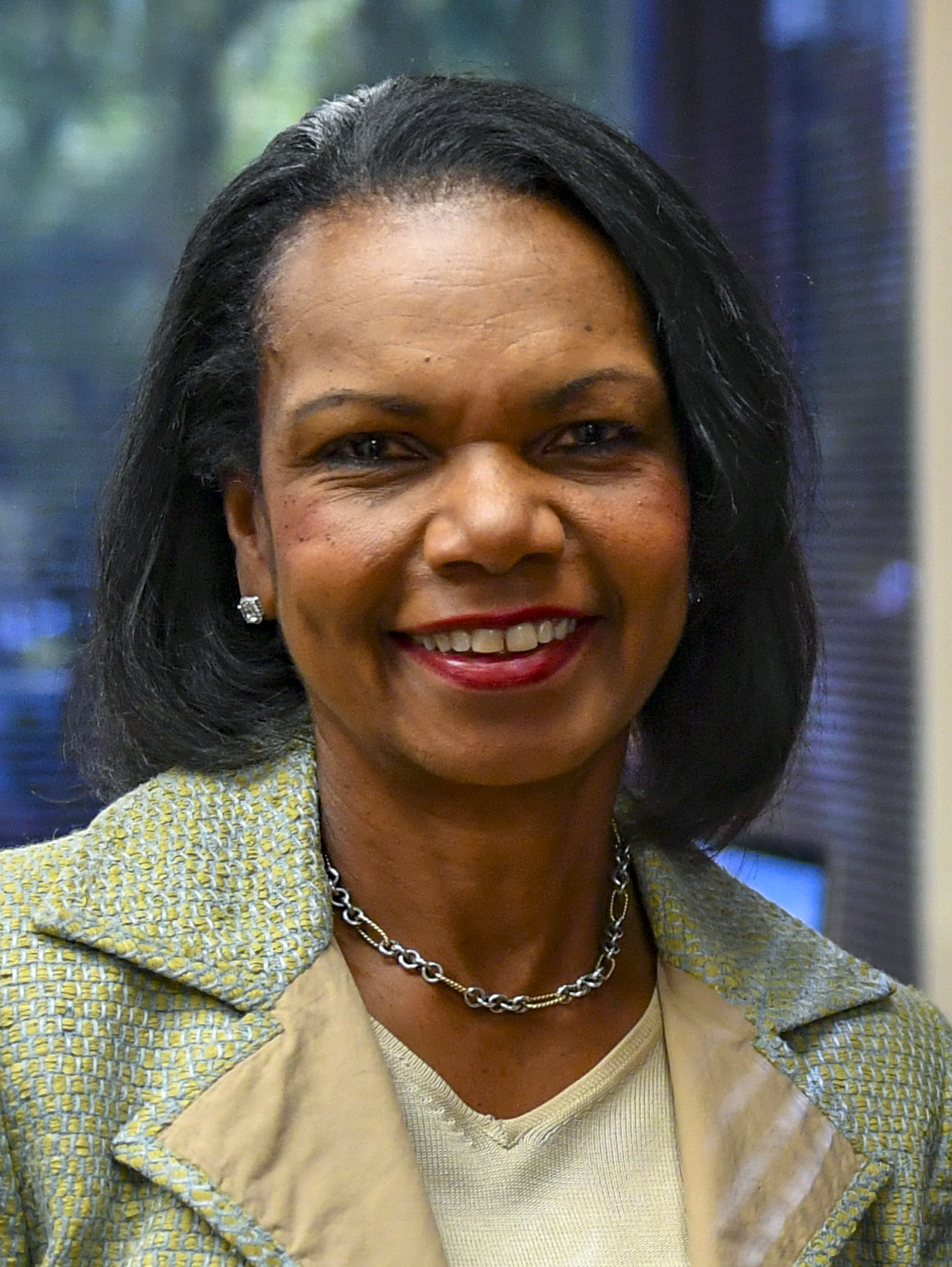
Former Secretary of State
Condoleezza Rice (Note: Individual is a member of the Republican Party)
from California
(2005–2009)

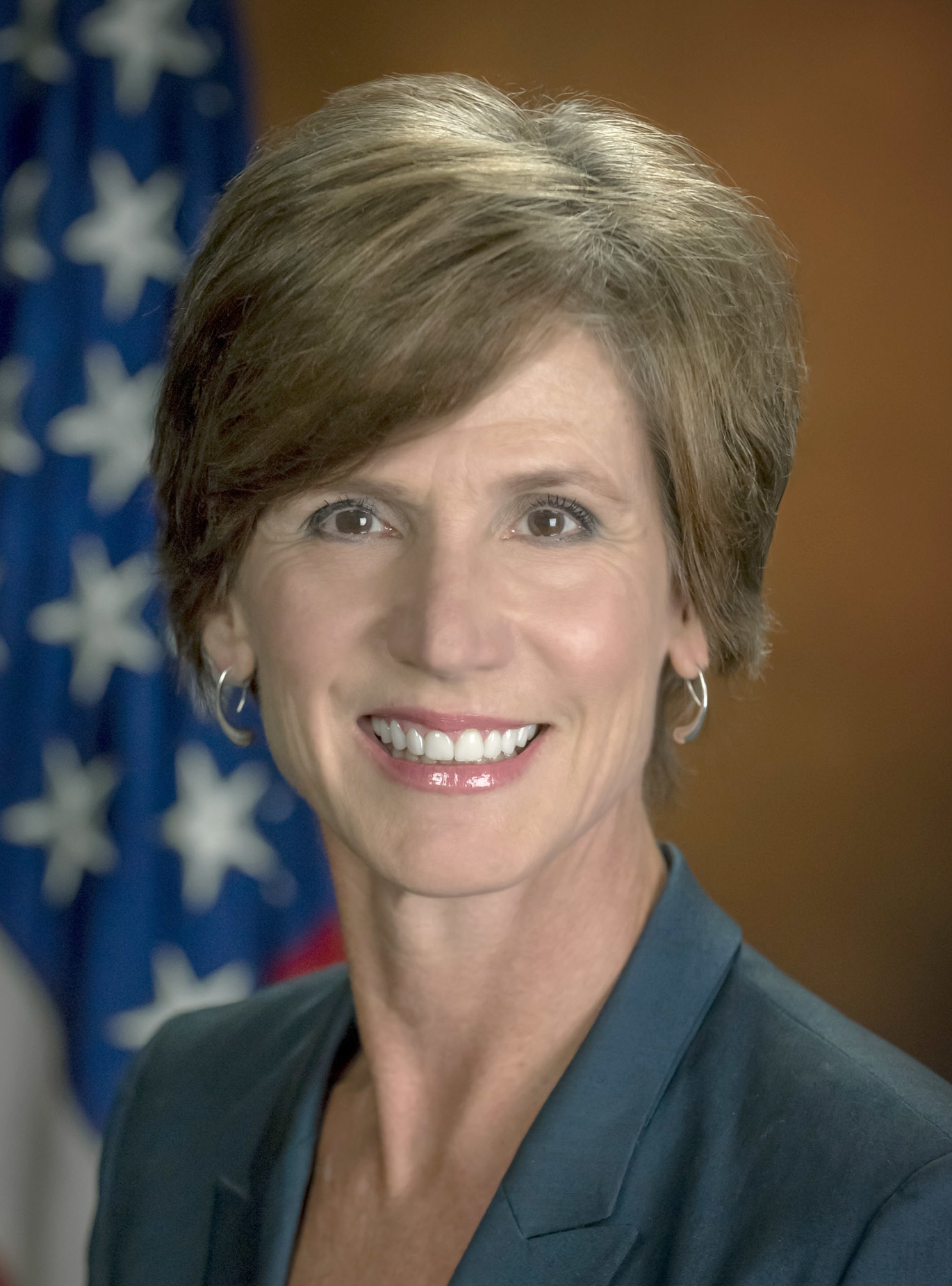
Former Deputy Attorney General
Sally Yates
from Georgia
(2015–2017)

=== Members of Congress ===
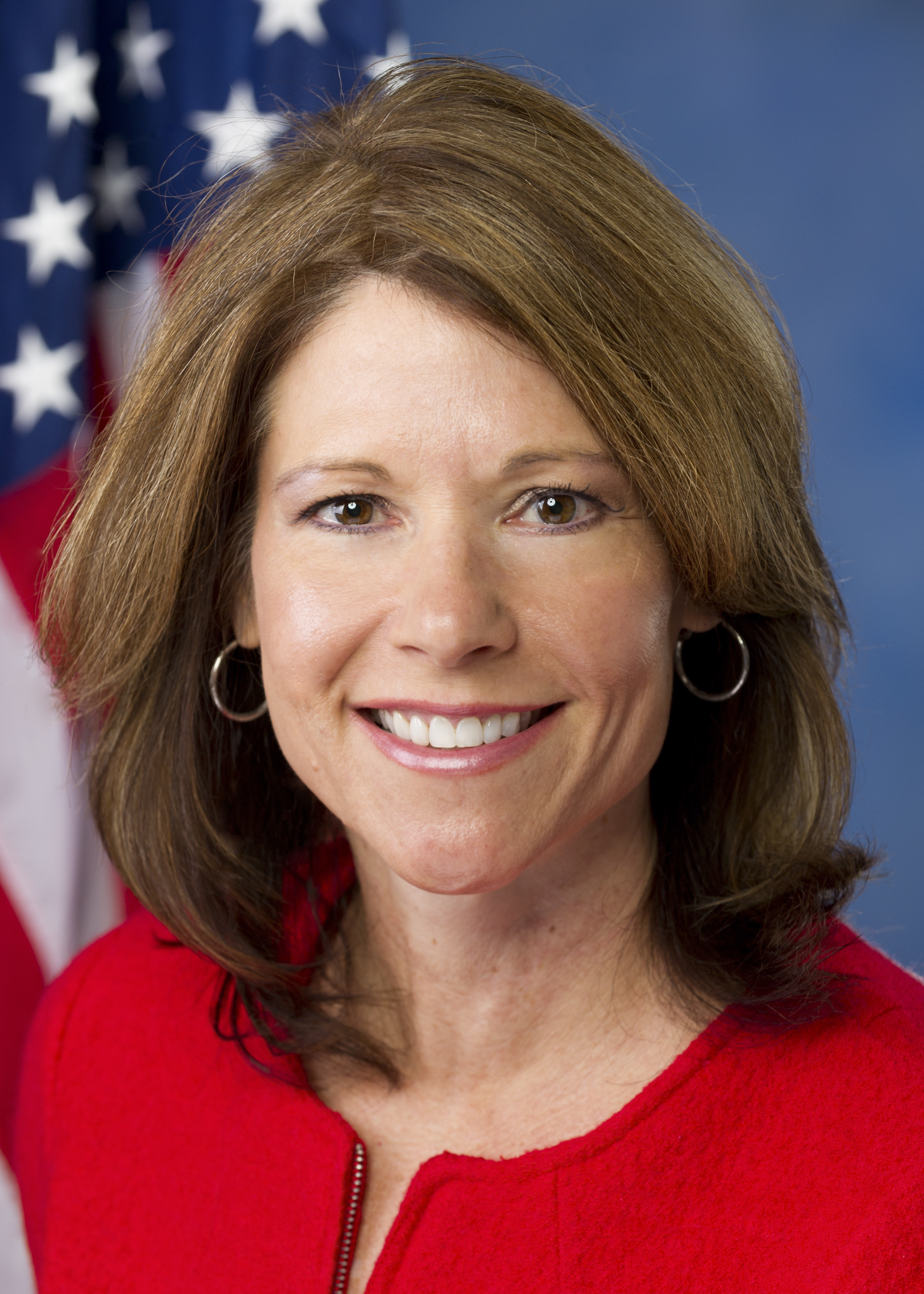
Representative
Cheri Bustos
from Illinois
(2013–2023)

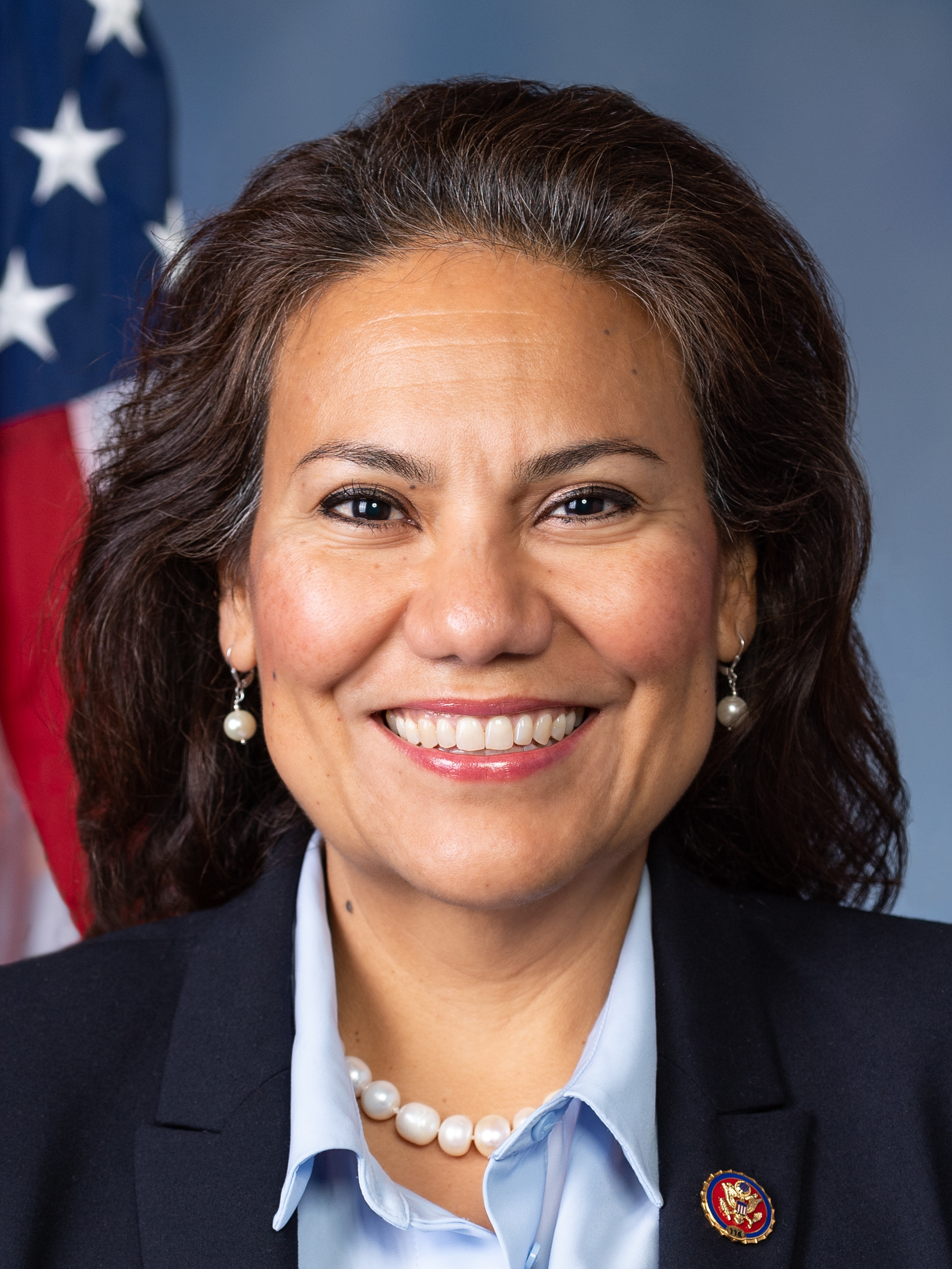
Representative
Veronica Escobar
from Texas
(2019–present)

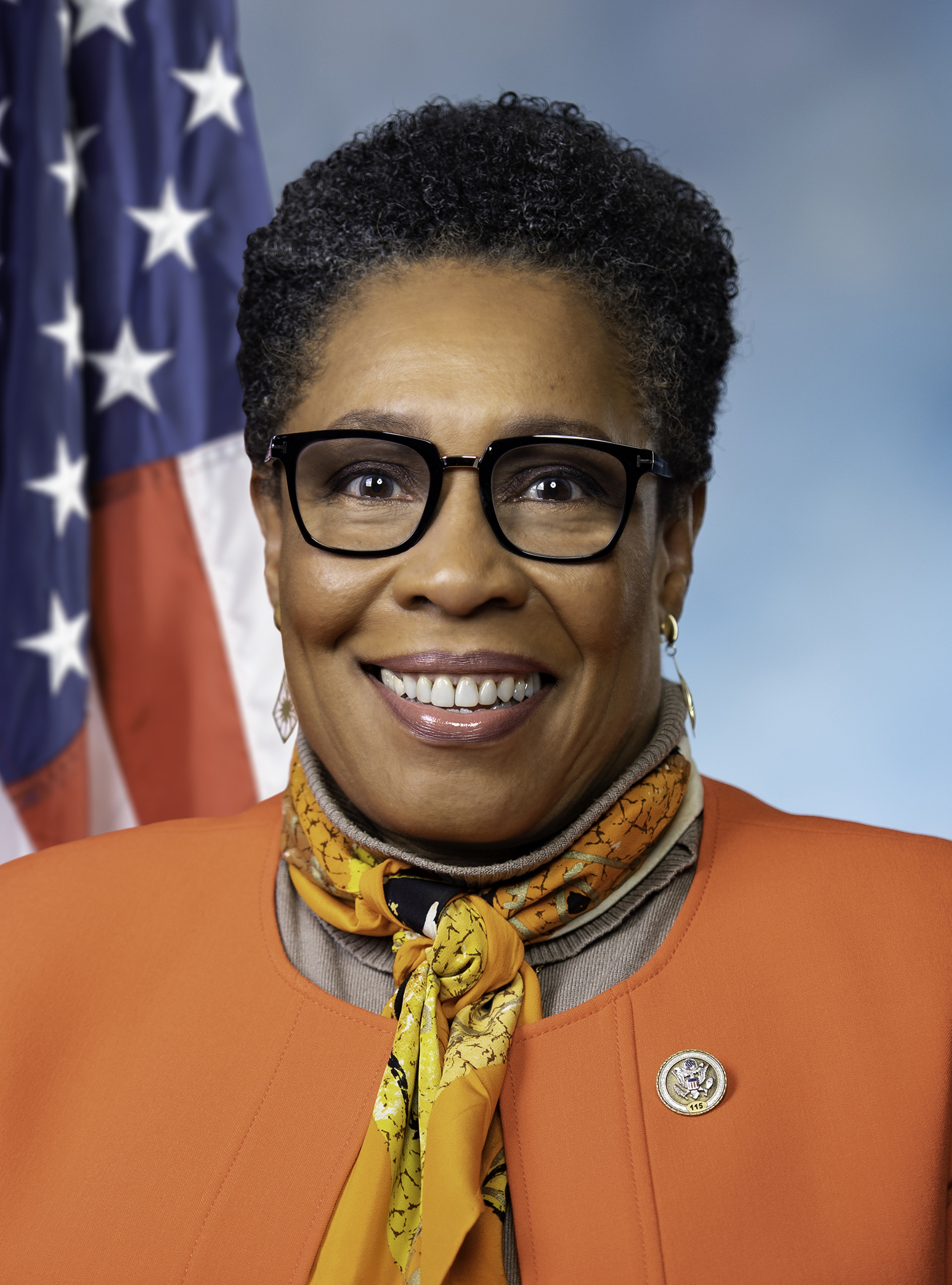
Representative
Marcia Fudge
from Ohio
(2008–2021)

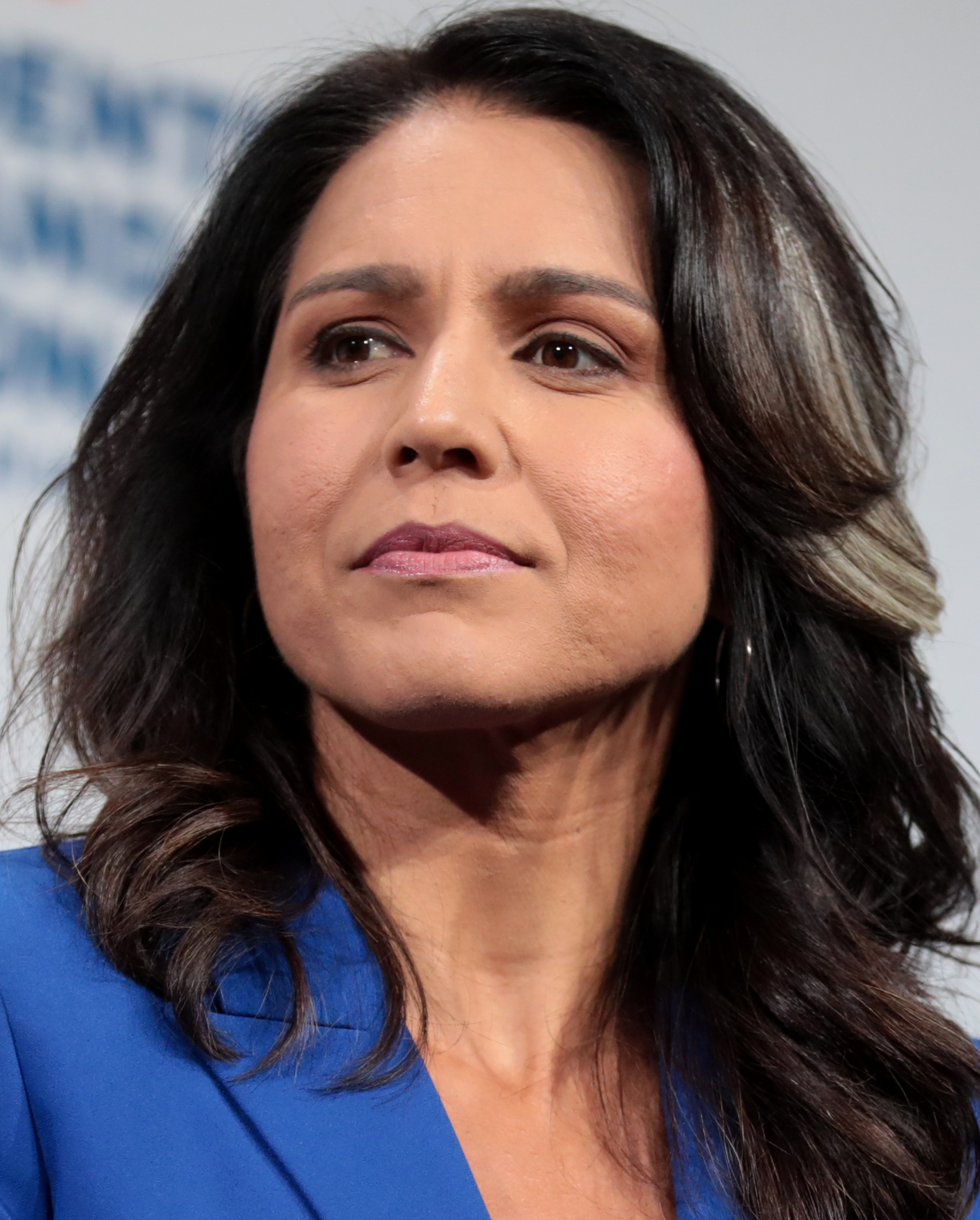
Representative and 2020 presidential candidate
Tulsi Gabbard
from Hawaii
(2013–2021)

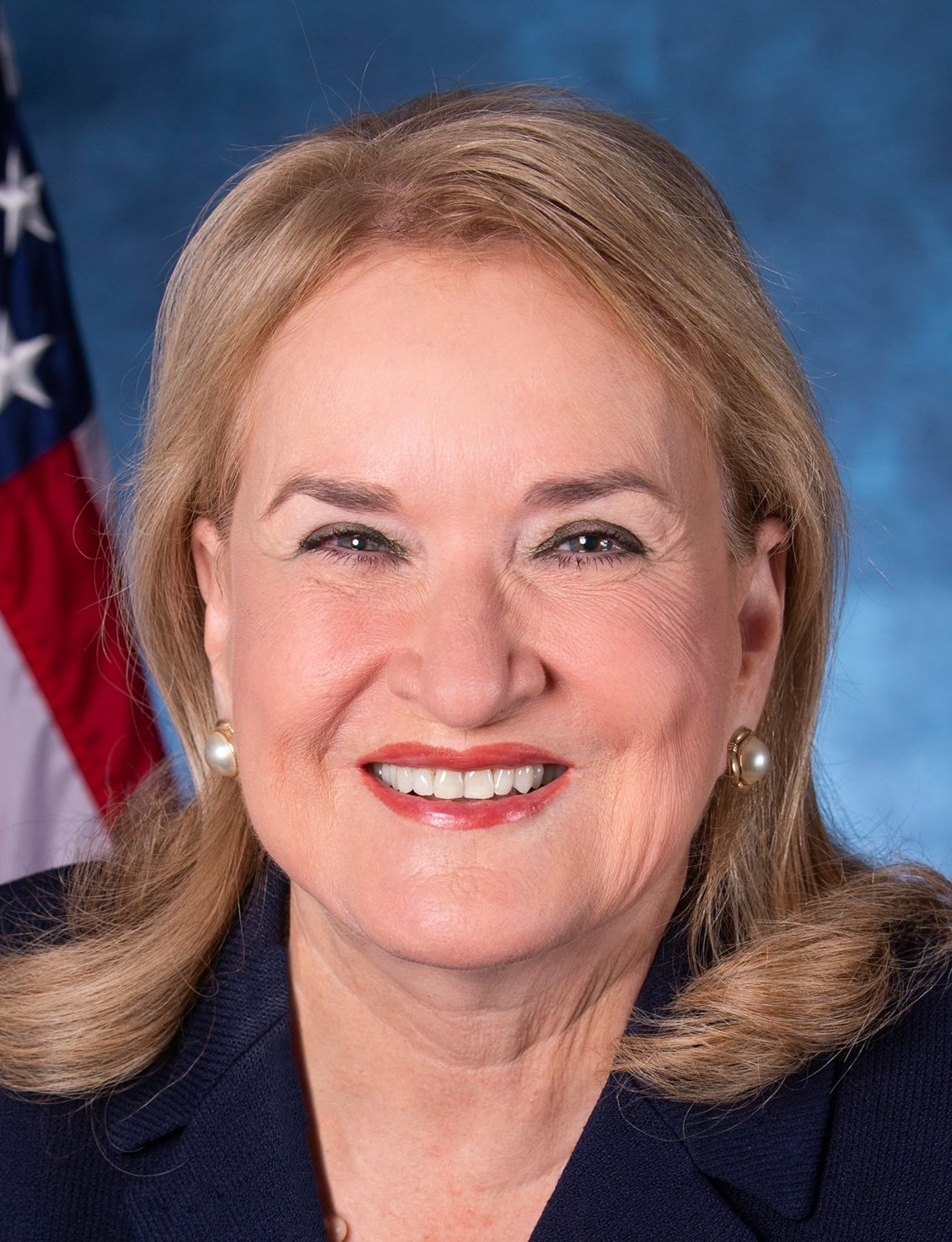
Representative
Sylvia Garcia
from Texas
(2019–present)

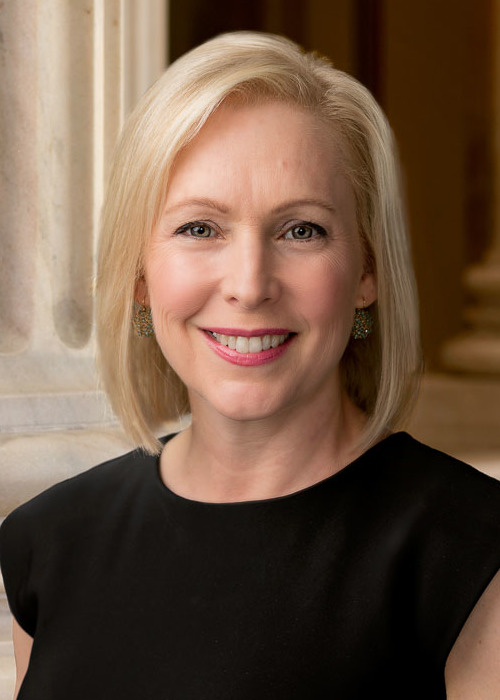
Senator and 2020 presidential candidate
Kirsten Gillibrand
from New York
(2009–present)

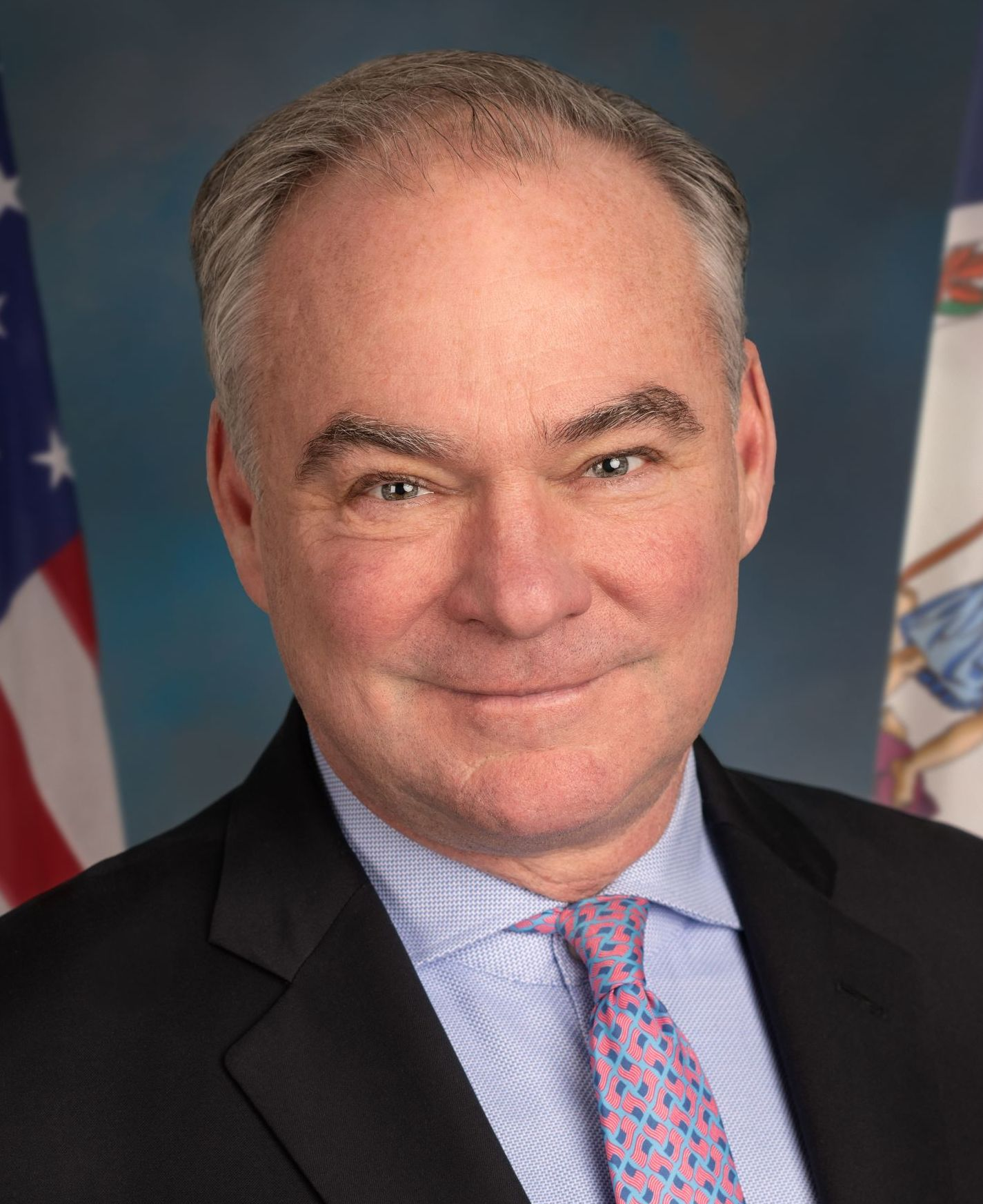
Senator and 2016 vice presidential nominee
Tim Kaine
from Virginia
(2013–present)

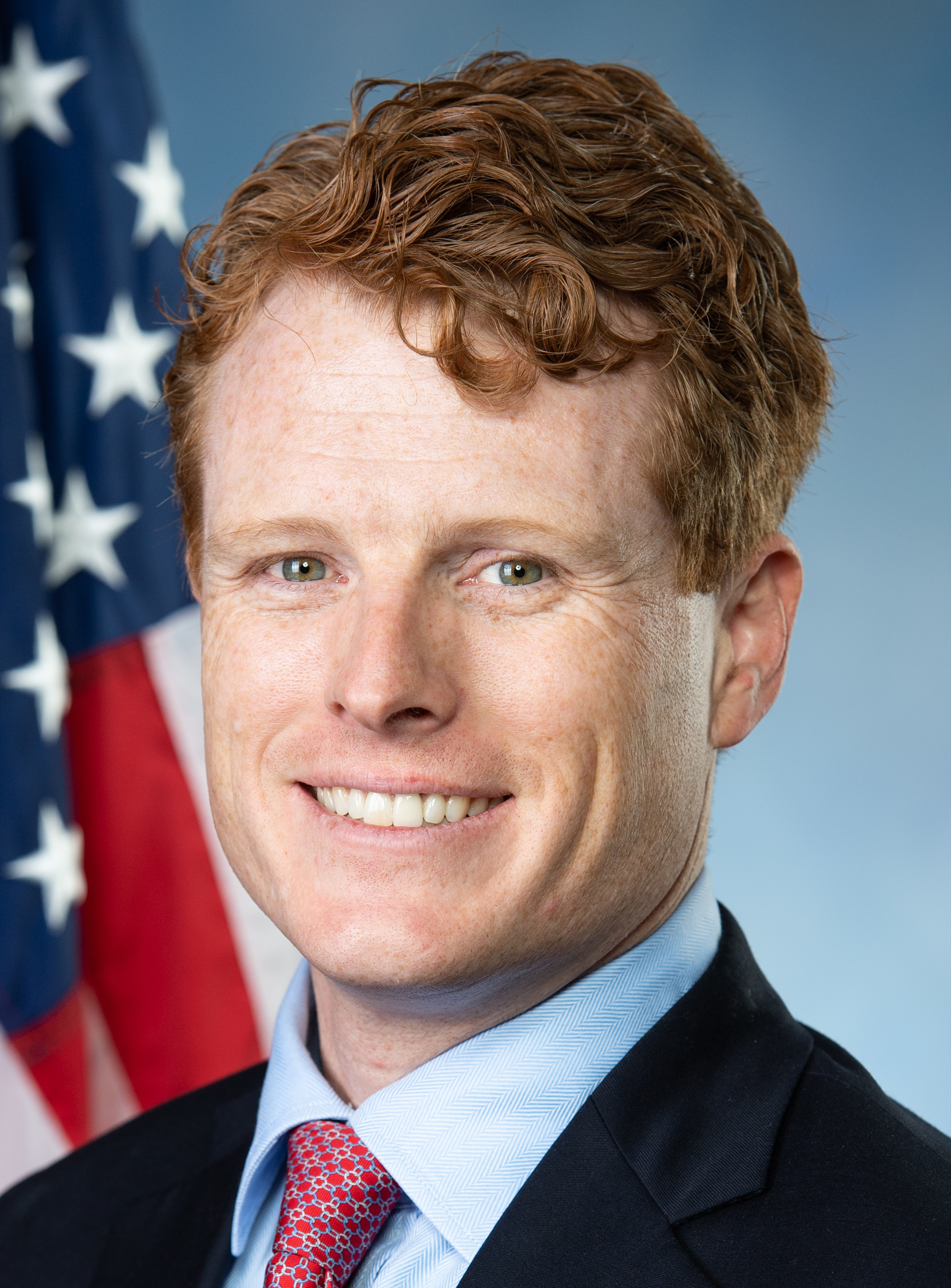
Representative
Joe Kennedy III
from Massachusetts
(2013–2021)

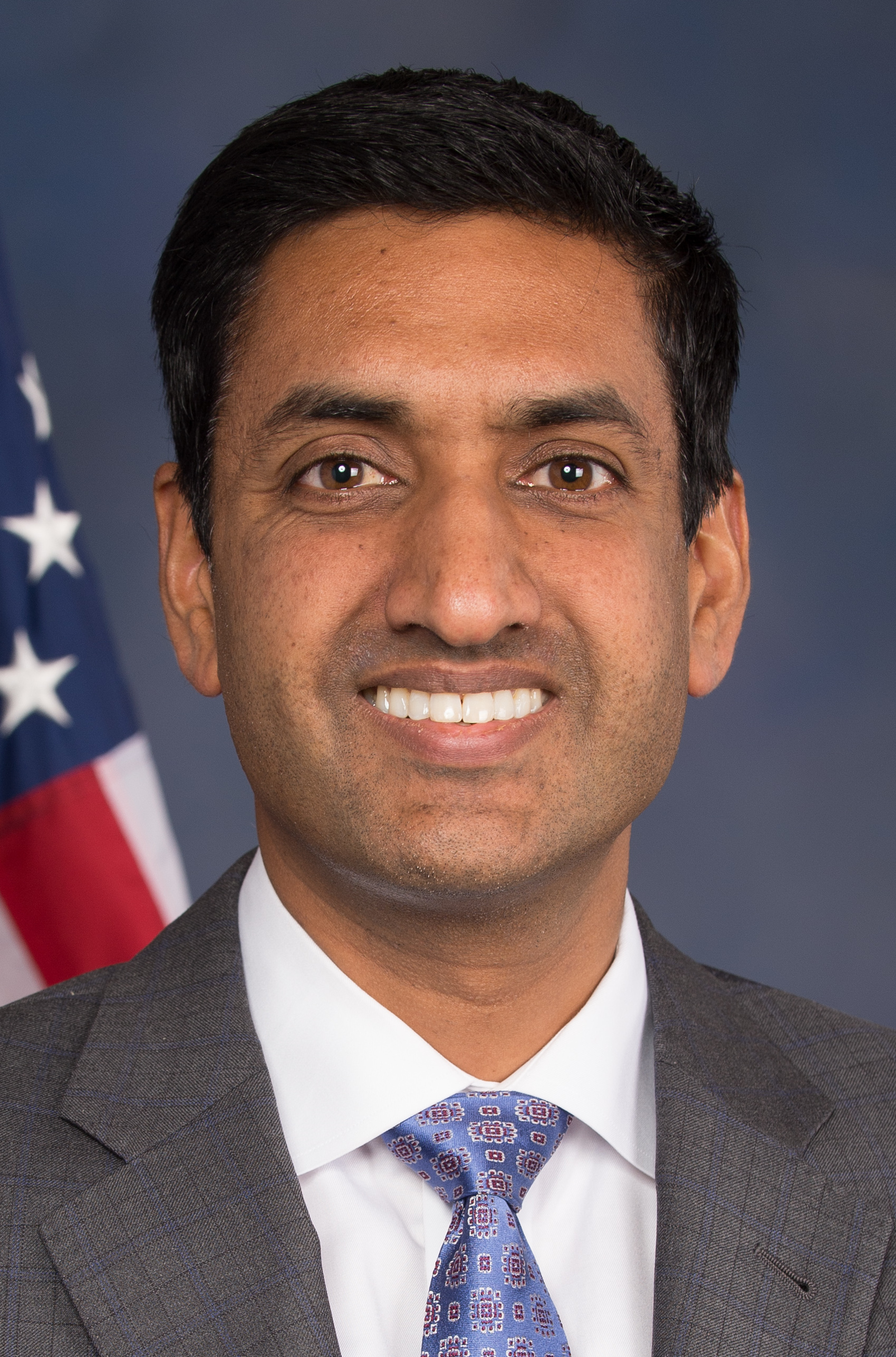
Representative
Ro Khanna
from California
(2017–present)

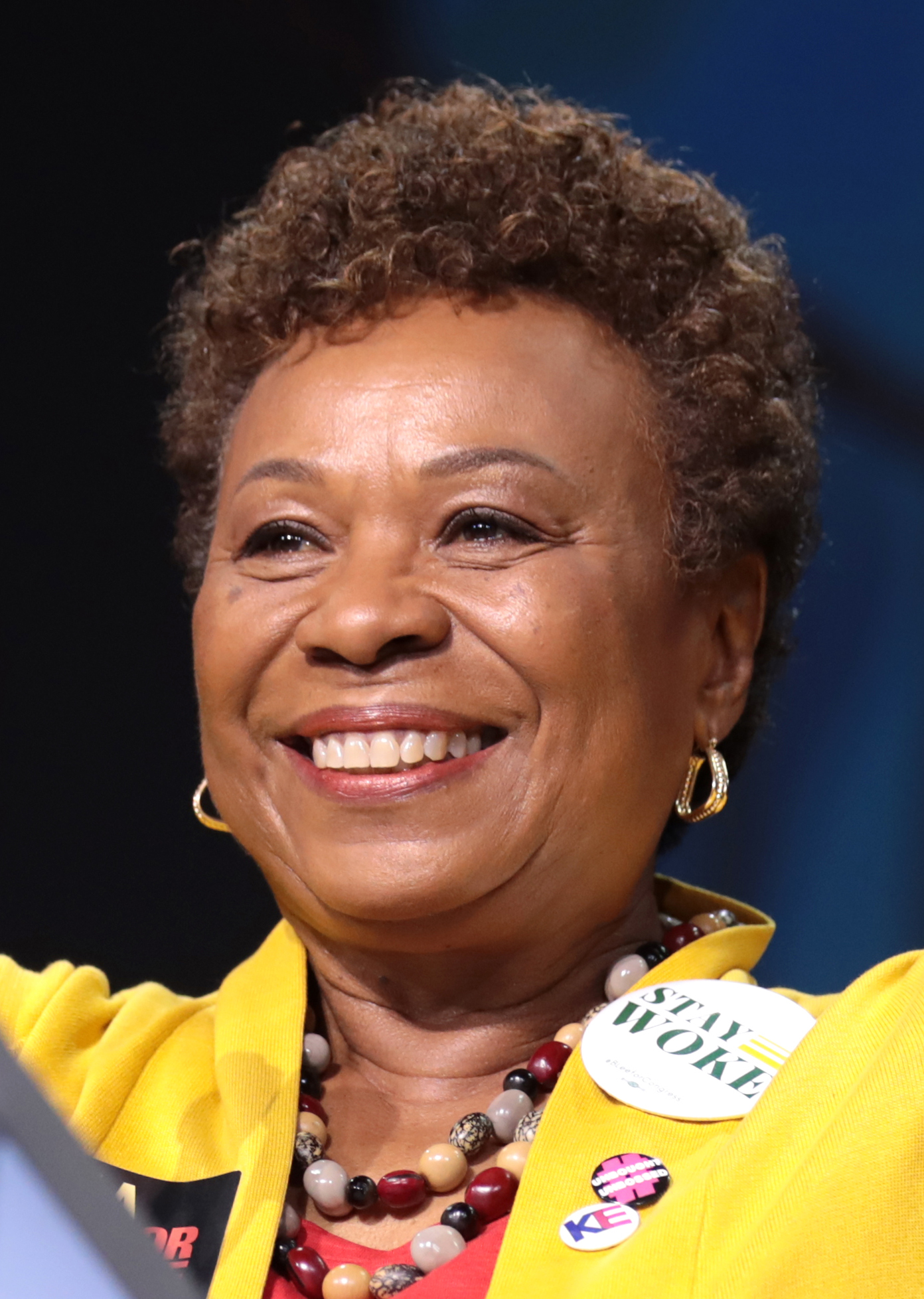
Representative
Barbara Lee
from California
(1998–2025)

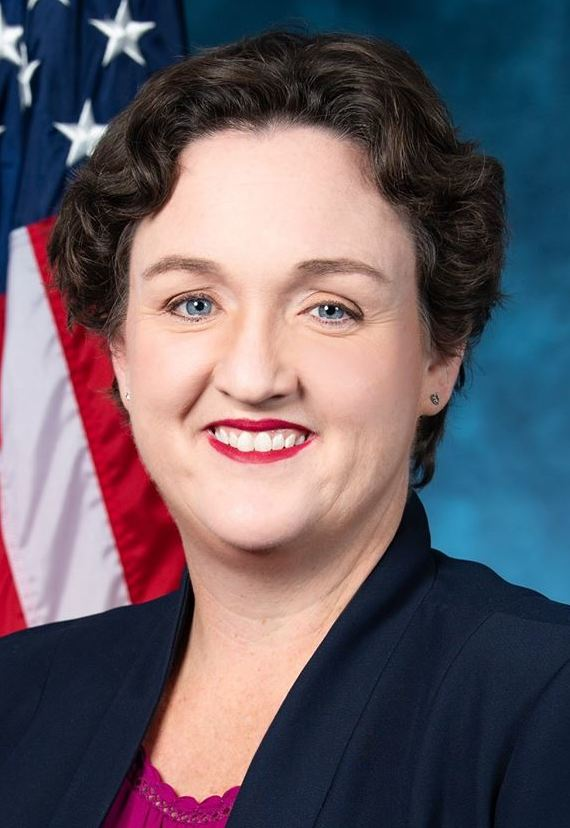
Representative
Katie Porter
from California
(2019–2025)

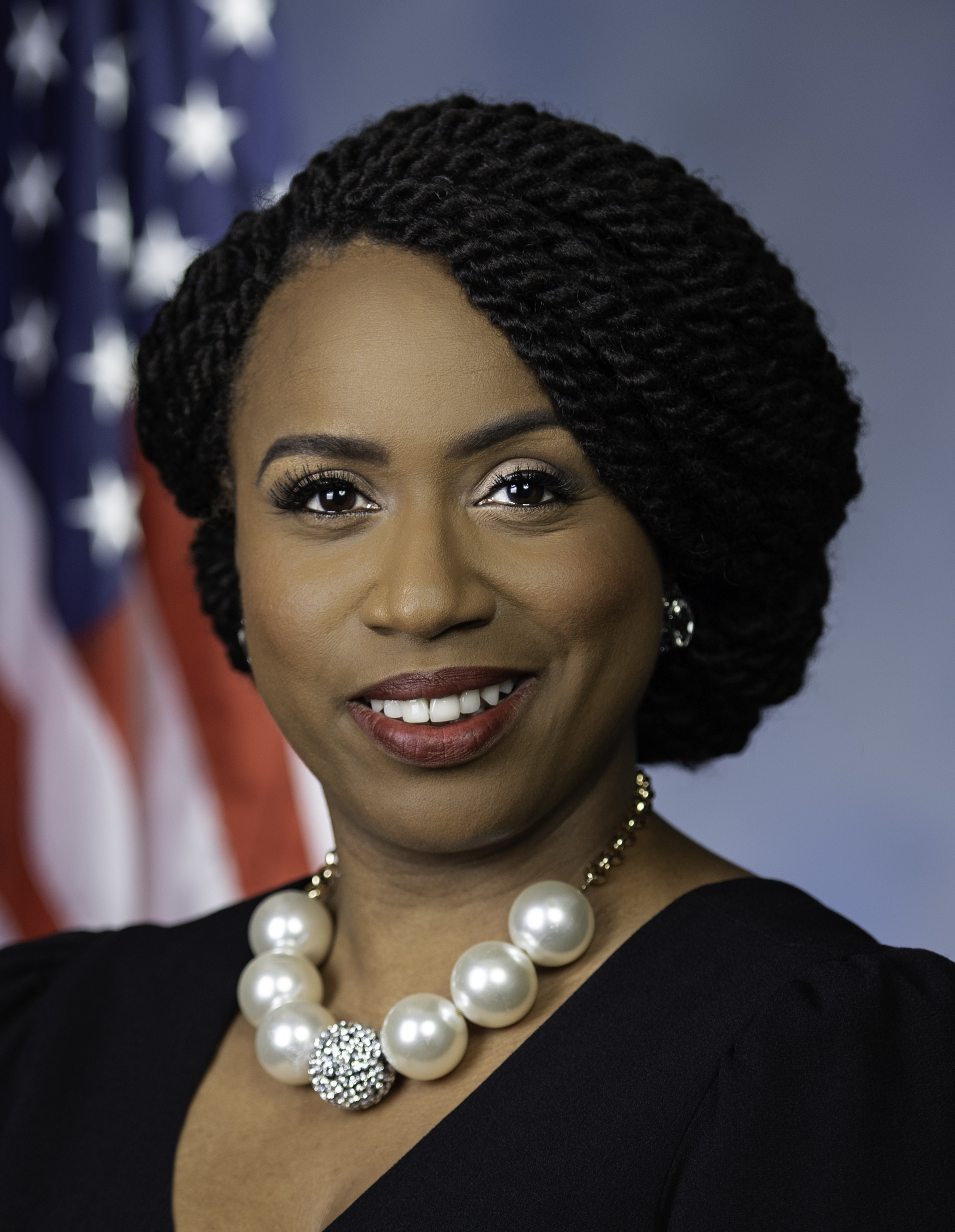
Representative
Ayanna Pressley
from Massachusetts
(2019–present)

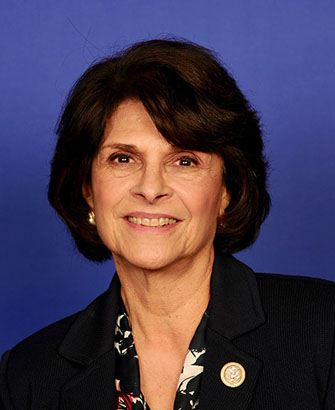
Representative
Lucille Roybal-Allard
from California
(1993–2023)

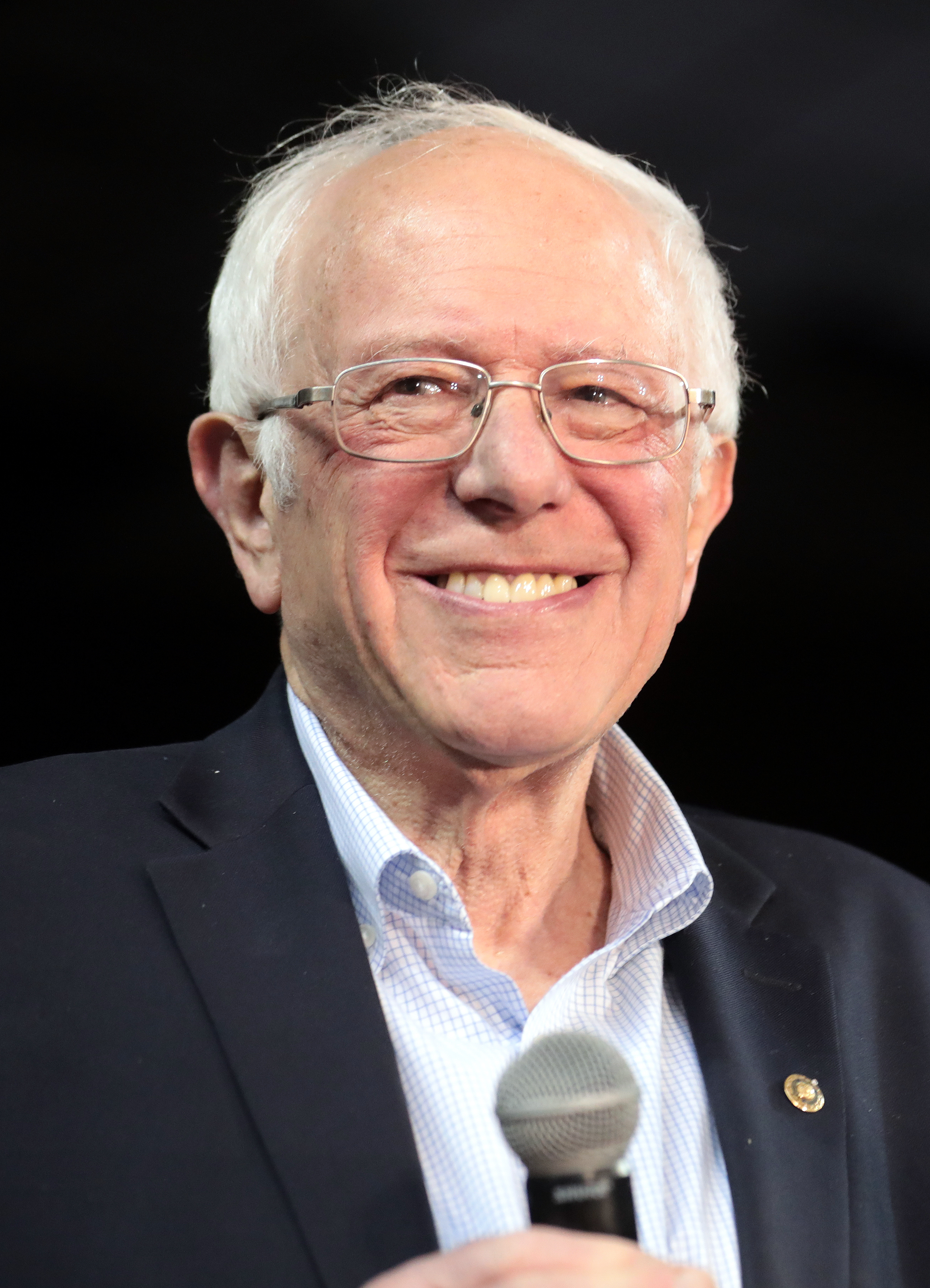
Senator, 2016 and 2020 presidential candidate
Bernie Sanders
from Vermont
(2007–present)

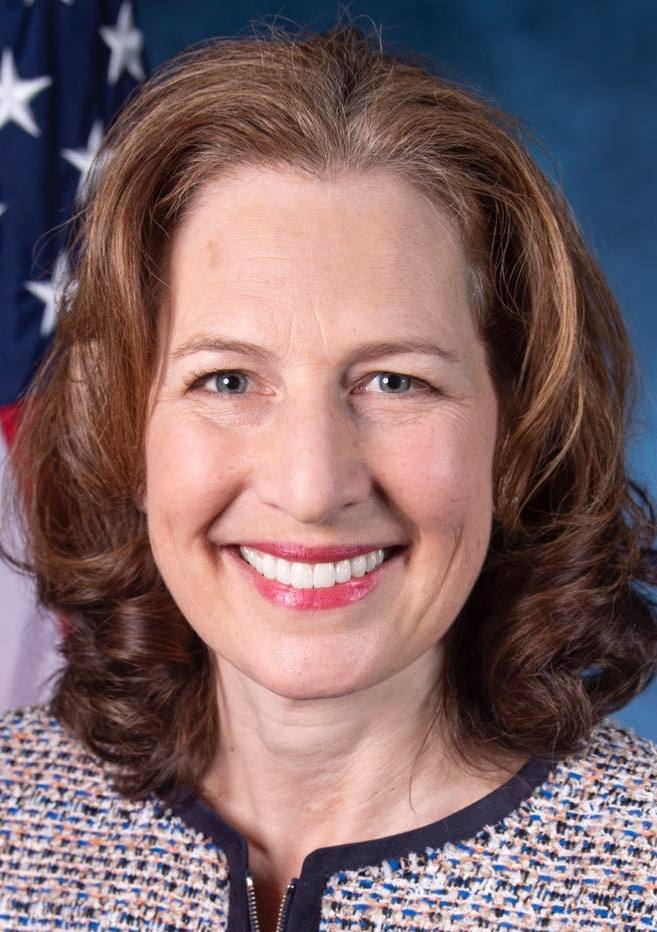
Representative
Kim Schrier
from Washington
(2019–present)

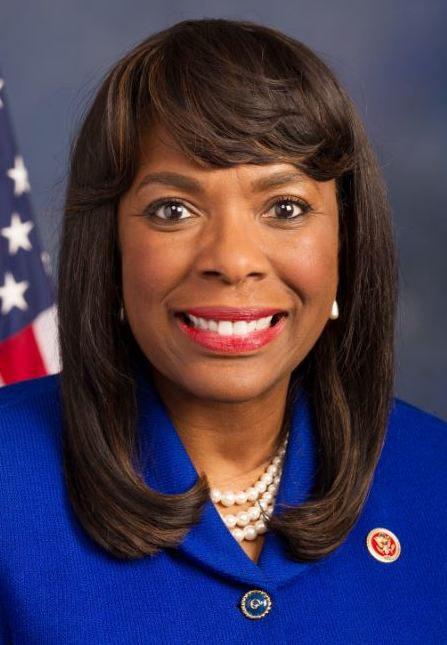
Representative
Terri Sewell
from Alabama
(2011–present)

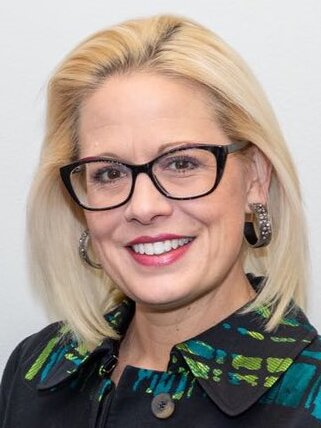
Senator
Kyrsten Sinema
from Arizona
(2019–2025)

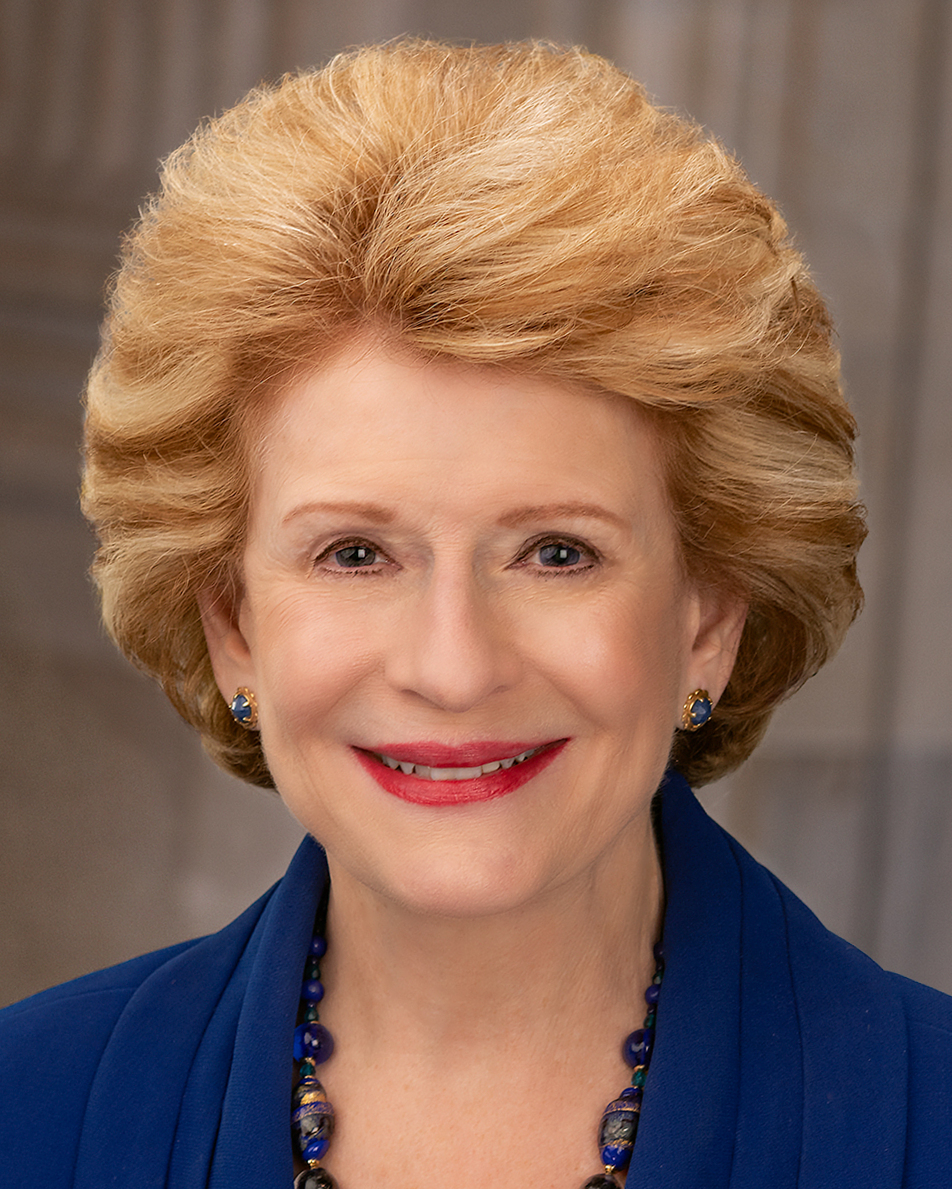
Senator
Debbie Stabenow
from Michigan
(2001–2025)

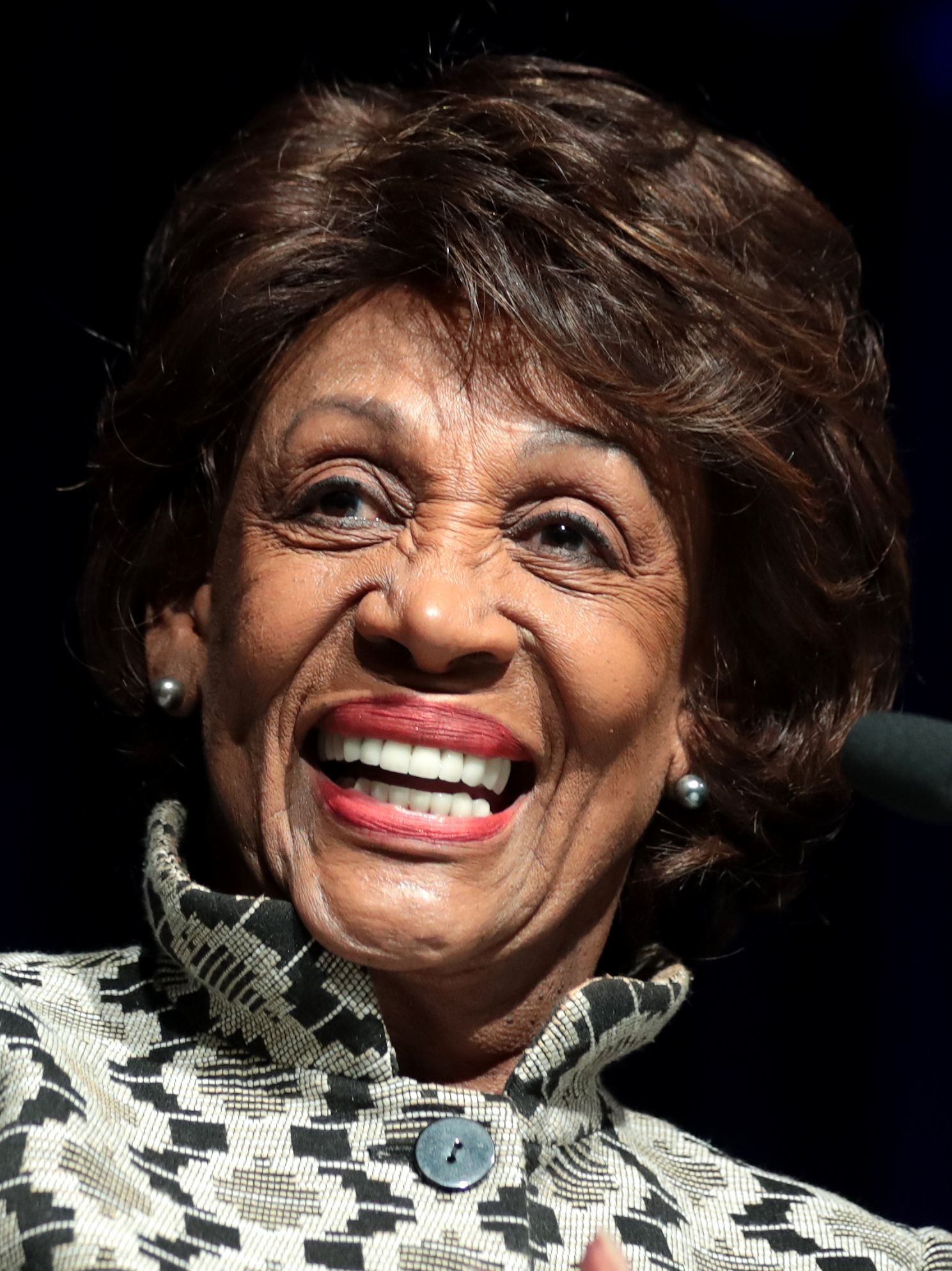
Representative
Maxine Waters
from California
(1991–present)

=== Governors ===
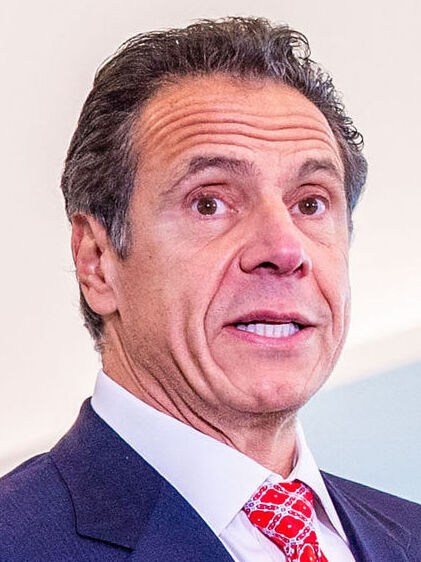
Governor
Andrew Cuomo
of New York
(2011–2021)

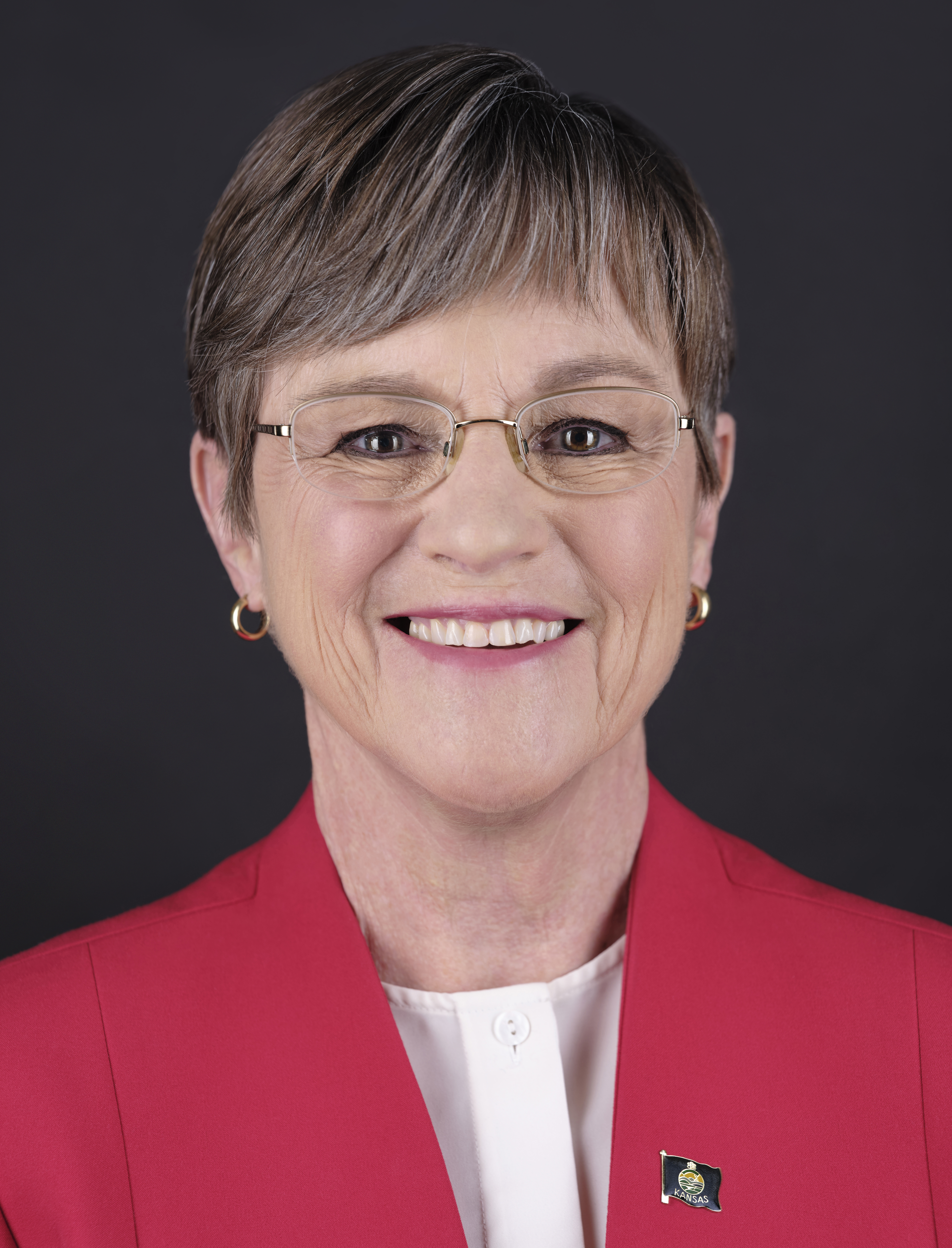
Governor
Laura Kelly
of Kansas
(2019–present)

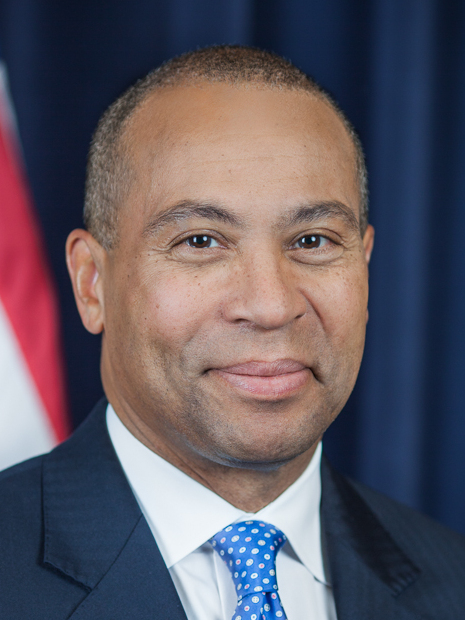
Former Governor and 2020 presidential candidate
Deval Patrick
of Massachusetts
(2007–2015)

=== Mayors ===
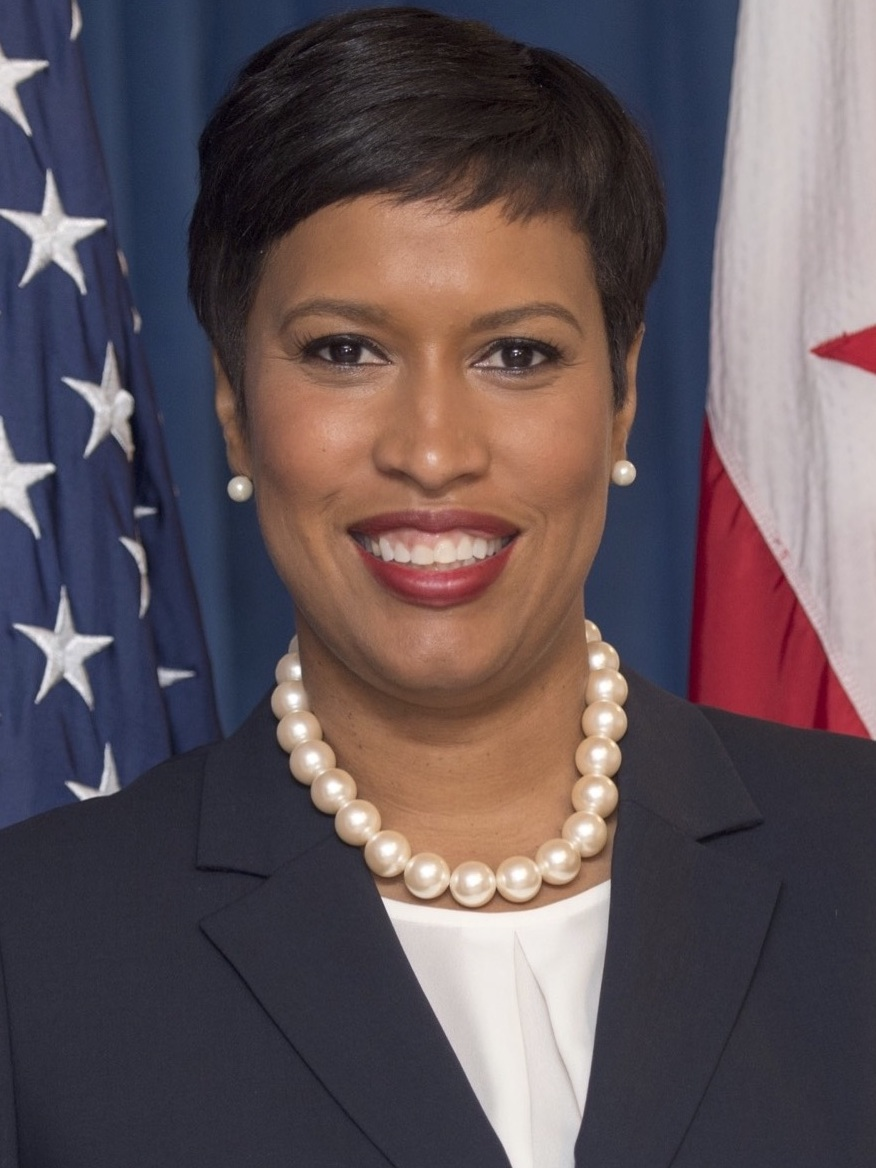
Mayor of the District of Columbia
Muriel Bowser
from Washington, D.C.
(2015–present)

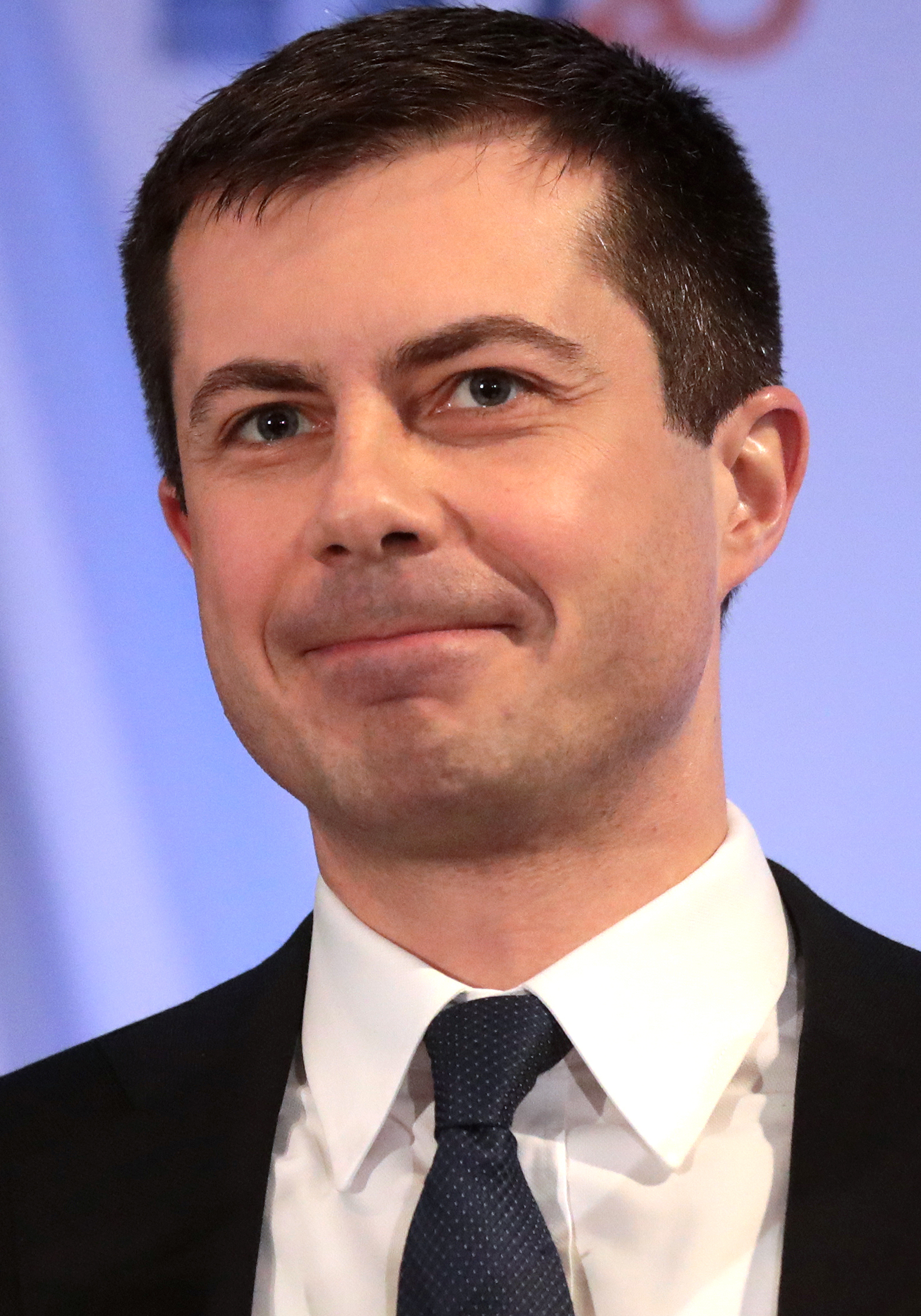
Former Mayor of South Bend and 2020 presidential candidate
Pete Buttigieg
from Indiana
(2012–2020)

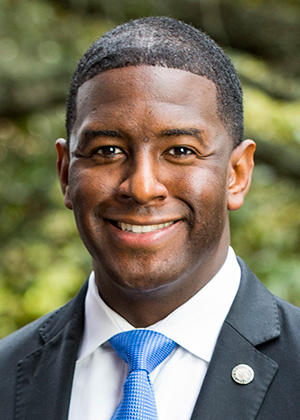
Former Mayor of Tallahassee
Andrew Gillum
from Florida
(2014–2018)

=== Other individuals ===
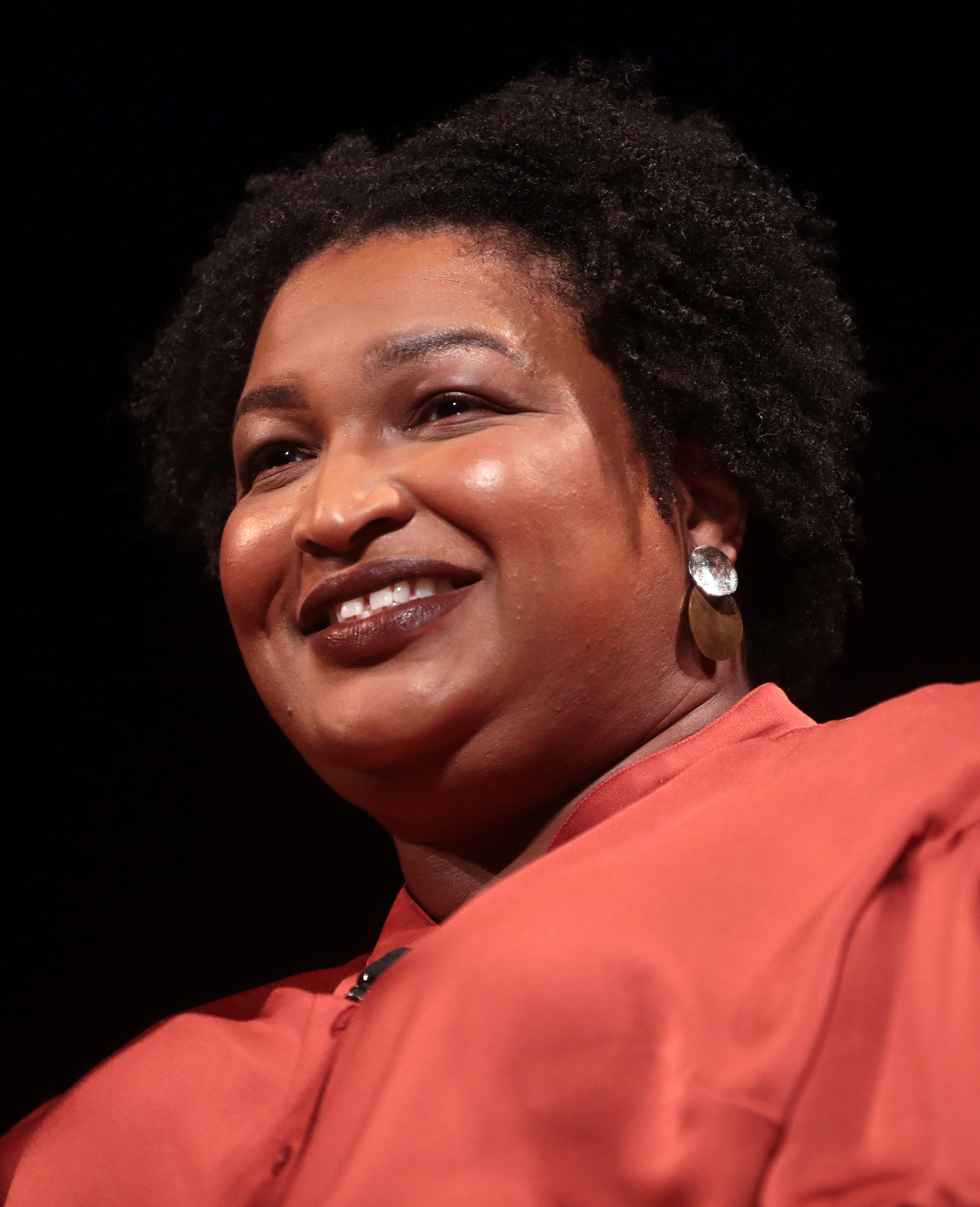
Former State House Minority Leader
Stacey Abrams
from Georgia
(2011–2017)

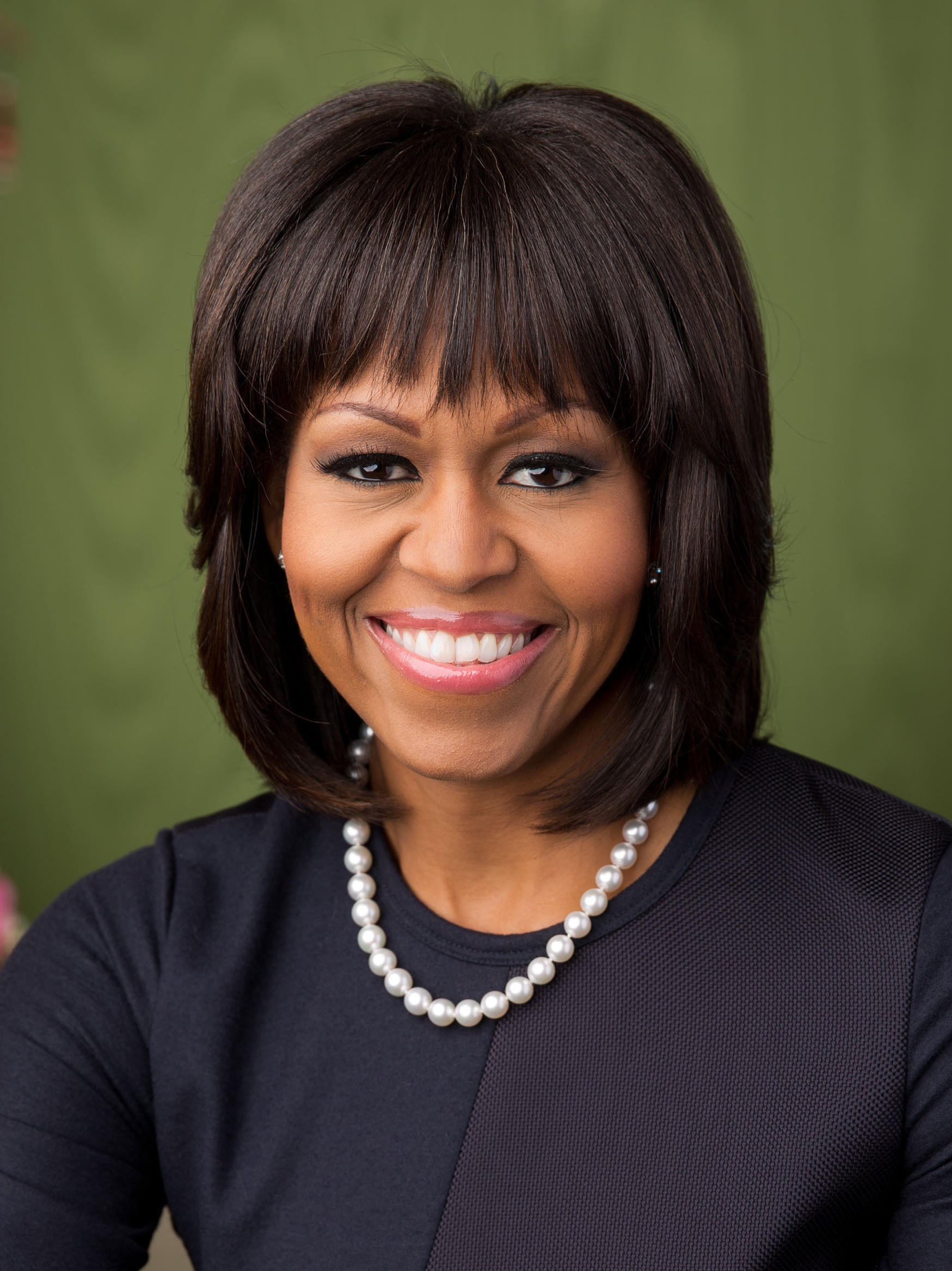
Former First Lady
Michelle Obama
from Illinois
(2009–2017)

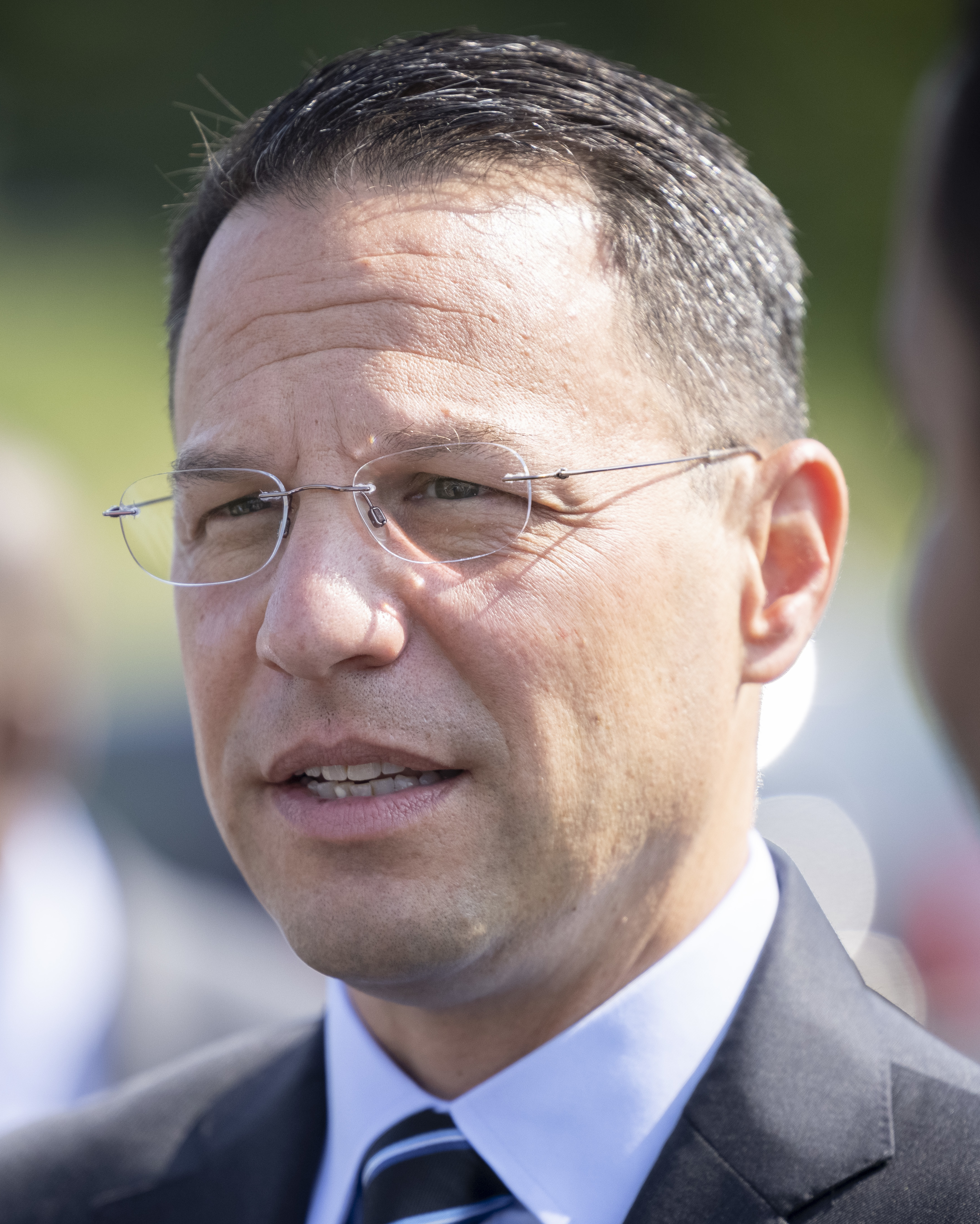
Attorney General
Josh Shapiro
from Pennsylvania
(2017–2023)

== Opinion polling ==
A Siena College/The New York Times poll released on June 26, 2020 found that over 80% of respondents said that race should not be a factor in Biden's selection.

A Politico/Morning Consult poll released on July 15, 2020 found that 54% of respondents felt that Biden's VP pick would not affect their vote, 16% said it would have a major impact, and 20% said it would have only a minor impact.

Vice presidential polling
Poll source	Date(s) administered	Sample size (Note: Key: A – all adults RV – registered voters LV – likely voters V – unclear)	Stacey Abrams	Tammy Baldwin	Karen Bass	Keisha Lance Bottoms	Catherine Cortez Masto	Val Demings	Tammy Duckworth	Kamala Harris	Amy Klobuchar	Michelle Lujan Grisham	Gina Raimondo	Susan Rice	Elizabeth Warren	Gretchen Whitmer	Others	Undecided
The Economist/YouGov	August 2–4, 2020	600 (RV)	6%	1%	1%	3%	–	3%	8%	22%	–	0%	–	11%	21%	3%	3% (Note: "Someone else" with 3%)	19%
Yahoo News/YouGov	July 28–30, 2020	1088 (RV)	8%	3%	3%	5%	–	4%	6%	25%	–	2%	2%	14%	22%	5%	–	–
Hill-HarrisX	July 20–21, 2020	947 (RV)	6%	3%	–	3%	–	3%	4%	15%	–	4%	–	12%	16%	4%	30% (Note: Nadja West with 5%; "None of the above / Someone else" with 25%)	–
Data for Progress	July 20, 2020	538 (RV) (Note: Poll included only voters not affiliated with a political party.)	8%	3%	1%	10%	–	3%	6%	21%	–	2%	–	6%	23%	4%	–	13%
Yahoo! News/YouGov	Jun 9–10, 2020	1288 (RV)	14%	–	–	6%	–	8%	–	24%	14%	–	–	–	30%	5%	–	–
Monmouth	Jun 1–9, 2020	2240 (LV)	10%	–	–	2%	–	7%	–	28%	12%	–	–	2%	13%	2%	8% (Note: including Michelle Obama with 3% and Tulsi Gabbard with 1%)	–
Yahoo! News/YouGov	May 4–5, 2020	1224 (RV)	11%	5%	–	–	6%	–	–	17%	18%	–	–	–	34%	8%	–	–
Vox	May 1, 2020	605 (V)	7%	–	–	–	3%	–	–	15%	9%	–	–	–	42%	4%	–	20%
CBS/YouGov	Apr 28–May 1, 2020	1671 (LV)	14%	1%	–	–	2%	3%	3%	19%	13%	1%	–	4%	36%	3%	1% (Note: Sally Yates with 1%)	–
Economist/YouGov	Apr 26–28, 2020	1222 (RV)	8%	2%	–	–	–	–	–	9%	7%	–	–	–	15%	2%	13% (Note: "Someone else" with 13%)	44%
Harvard/Harris	Apr 14–16, 2020	2394 (RV)	–	–	–	–	–	–	–	10%	10%	1%	–	–	13%	3%	63% (Note: Bernie Sanders with 20%; Andrew Cuomo with 11%; Michael Bloomberg with 8%; Pete Buttigieg with 7%; Tom Steyer with 3%; "Other" with 14%)	–

== See also ==
- Joe Biden 2020 presidential campaign
- 2020 Democratic Party presidential candidates
- 2020 Democratic Party presidential primaries
- 2020 Democratic National Convention
- 2020 United States presidential election
- List of United States major party presidential tickets
