= Political positions of Kamala Harris =

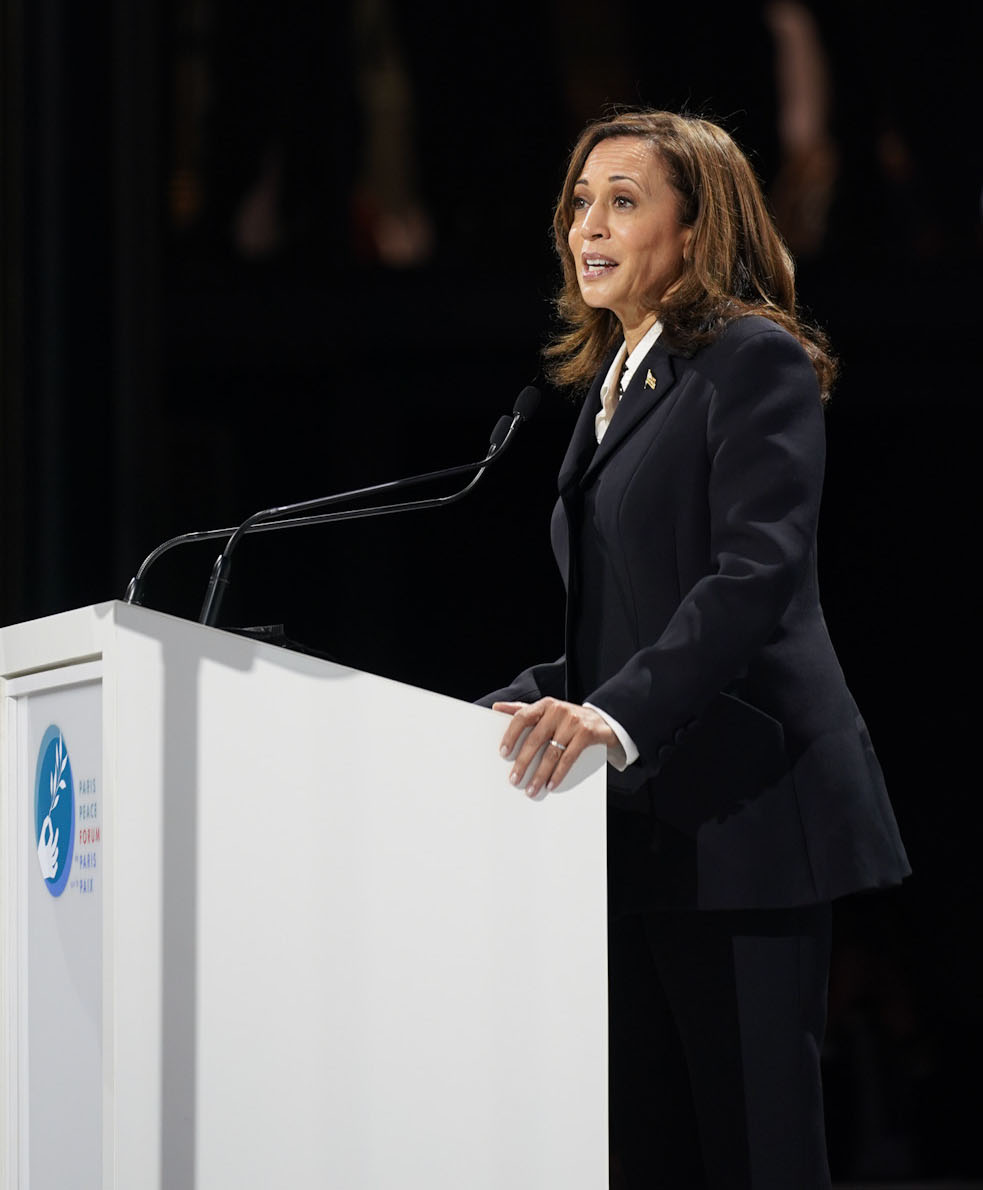
Vice President Kamala Harris delivering a speech at the 2021 Paris Peace Forum

The political positions of Kamala Harris are reflected by her United States Senate voting record, public speeches, and interviews. Harris served as the junior senator from California from 2017 to 2021. On August 11, 2020, presumptive Democratic presidential nominee Joe Biden selected her as his running mate in the 2020 United States presidential election, running against incumbent U.S. president Donald Trump and vice president Mike Pence. With Biden's victory, Harris became vice president. She announced her candidacy in the 2024 United States presidential election after Biden chose not to run for reelection on July 21, 2024.

== Political orientation ==
Harris's politics are widely seen as consistent with Biden's. In 2020, The New York Times called her a "pragmatic moderate", with policy positions that broadly mirror Biden's. CNN called her voting record in the Senate "certainly one of the most liberal", but noted that her record before her Senate tenure was more moderate on some issues. The nonpartisan GovTrack listed Harris as the fourth-most liberal senator from 2017 to 2019, based on a number of factors, including the bills she co-sponsored, and the second-most liberal from 2019 to 2021. The Atlantic wrote in 2024 that "during her 2020 presidential bid, she took some positions to the left of her prior record—several of which she's now walked back in her current bid for president."

== Social issues ==
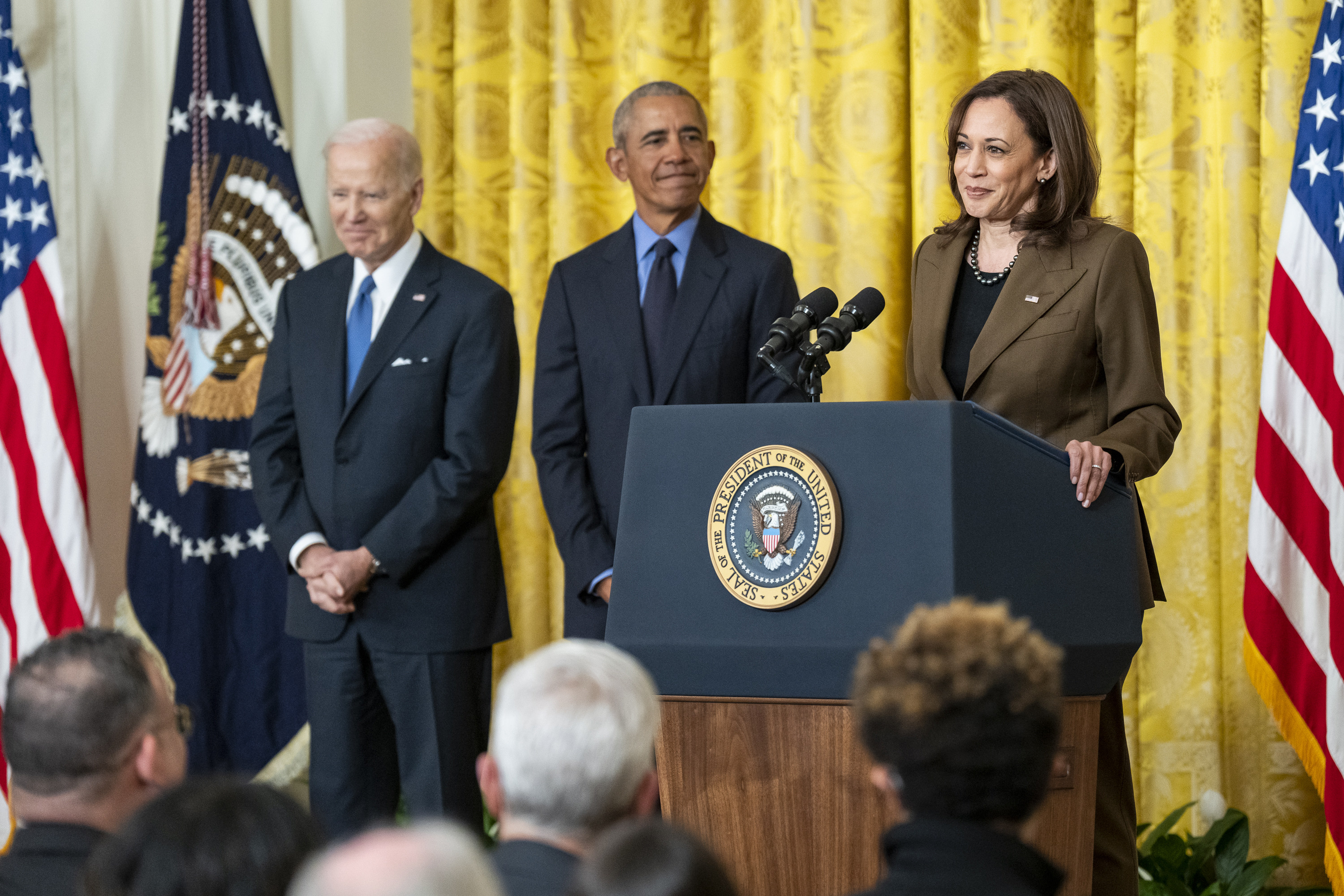
President Joe Biden and former president Barack Obama look on as Vice President Harris delivers remarks on the Affordable Care Act, April 2022.

=== Abortion ===
Harris supports abortion rights, and reproductive health care was central to her presidential campaign. She has been called "the Biden administration's voice for reproductive rights" and "the White House's voice of unflinching support for reproductive health rights". Several abortion rights and women's organizations supported her after Biden withdrew from the race, with Reproductive Freedom for All saying "there is nobody who has fought as hard [as Harris] for abortion rights and access" and EMILY's List calling her "our most powerful advocate and messenger" on reproductive rights.

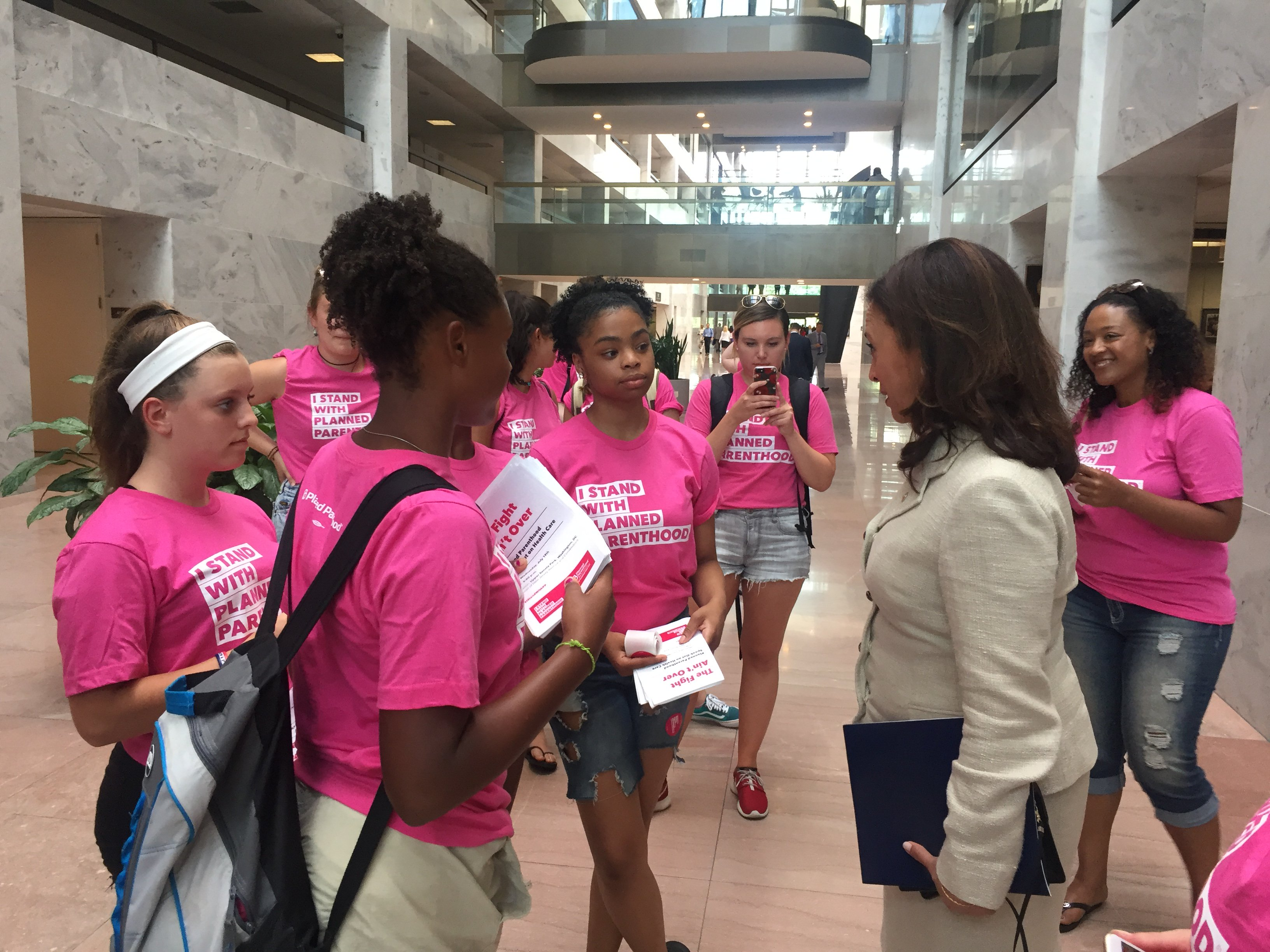
Planned Parenthood activists meeting with then-Senator Kamala Harris in 2017

As of 2020, Harris had a 100% rating from the abortion rights advocacy group Planned Parenthood Action Fund, and a 0% rating from the anti-abortion group National Right to Life Committee. EMILY's List endorsed her in 2015, during her senatorial campaign.

=== Affirmative action ===
Harris opposed California's ban on affirmative action and filed an amicus curiae brief in the Supreme Court case Fisher v. University of Texas (2016), asking that the Court "reaffirm its decision that public colleges and universities may consider race as one factor in admissions decisions".

=== Capital punishment ===
Harris opposes the death penalty, but has said that she would review each case individually. Robert Dunham, executive director of the Death Penalty Information Center, said she has "a mixed record".

As the district attorney of San Francisco, Harris opposed the death penalty, refusing to request it for a man charged with the murder of a police officer. This decision was controversial and criticized by Senator Dianne Feinstein. As California attorney general, Harris was criticized for appealing a federal court ruling that might have resulted in the abolition of the death penalty in the state for not supporting two ballot initiatives that would have banned the death penalty there. But in July 2019, as U.S. Attorney General William Barr announced the federal government's resumption of capital punishment after nearly 20 years without executing a federal inmate, Harris called the move "misguided", "immoral", and "a gross misuse of taxpayer dollars". As a senator, she also co-sponsored a 2019 bill that would have banned the death penalty.

=== Criminal justice ===
In December 2018, Harris voted for the First Step Act, legislation aimed at reducing recidivism rates among federal prisoners by expanding job training and other programs, in addition to forming an expansion of early release programs and modifications on sentencing laws such as mandatory minimum sentences for nonviolent drug offenders, "to more equitably punish drug offenders".

In March 2020, Harris was one of 15 senators to sign a letter to the Federal Bureau of Prisons and private prison companies GEO Group, CoreCivic, and Management and Training Corporation requesting information on their strategy to address the COVID-19 pandemic, asserting that it was "critical that [you] have a plan to help prevent the spread of the novel coronavirus to incarcerated individuals and correctional staff, along with their families and loved ones, and provide treatment to incarcerated individuals and staff who become infected."

In June 2020, after a campaign by a coalition of community groups, including Black Lives Matter, Los Angeles Mayor Eric Garcetti announced Los Angeles Police Department budget cuts of $150 million. Harris supported the decision:

We've got to reexamine what we're doing with American taxpayer dollars and ask the question "Are we getting the right return on our investment? Are we actually creating healthy and safe communities?" That's a legitimate conversation and it requires a really critical evaluation. I applaud Eric Garcetti for doing what he's done.

In 2020 Harris tweeted in support of donations to the Minnesota Freedom Fund, a bail fund assisting those arrested in the George Floyd protests, though she did not donate to the fund herself.

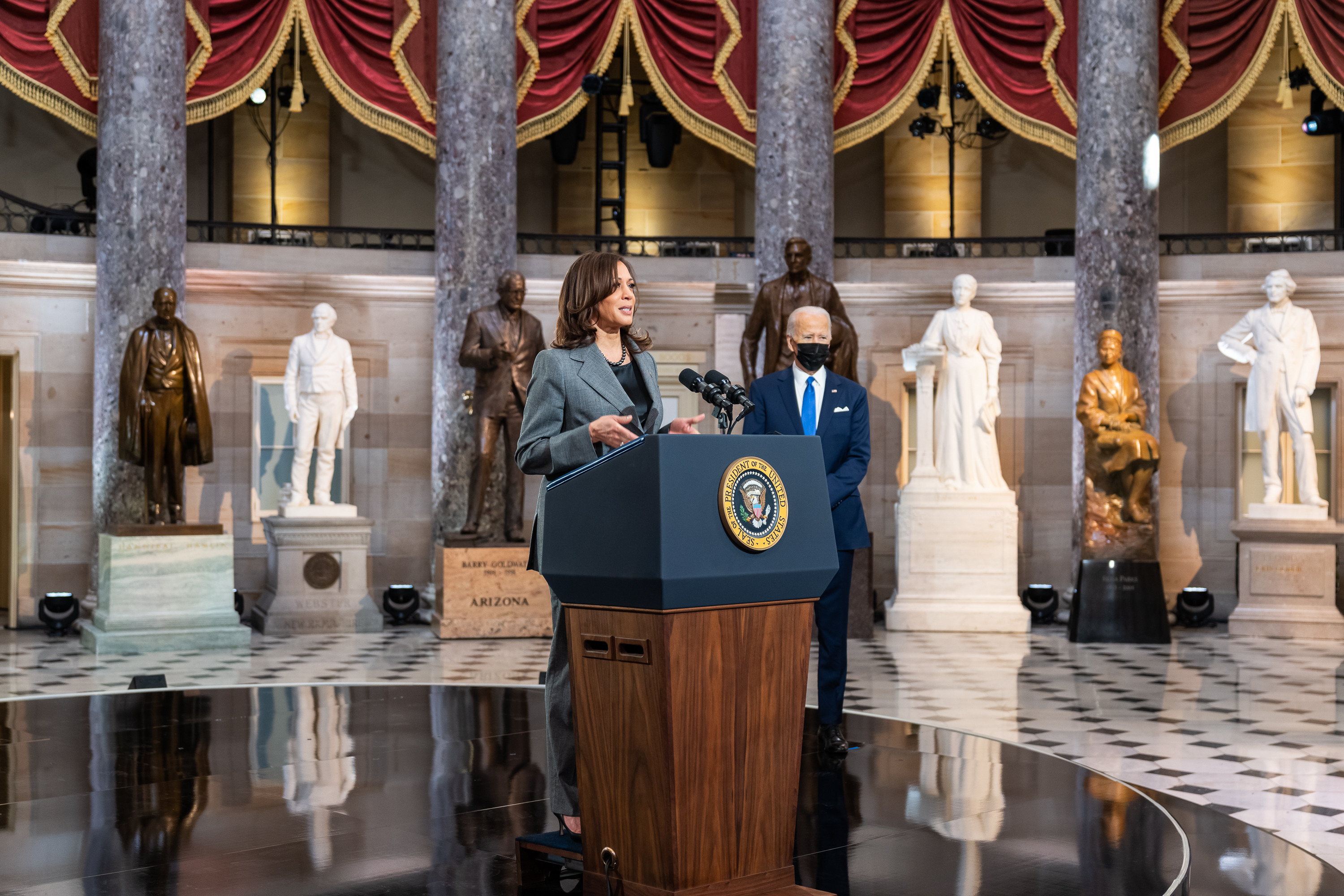
President Biden and Vice President Harris delivered remarks at the Capitol on the anniversary of the United States Capitol attack, January 6, 2022.

Harris's criminal justice record has been seen as mixed, with critics calling her "tough on crime" despite her calling herself a "progressive prosecutor", citing her reluctance to release prisoners and anti-truancy policies. In her 2009 book, Harris criticized liberals for what she called "biases against law enforcement".

=== Drugs ===
Harris did not initially support legalization of recreational cannabis, but later moved to support it. In 2010, while San Francisco District Attorney and campaigning for Attorney General of California, she opposed Proposition 19, the first attempt to legalize recreational cannabis in California, arguing that selling drugs harms communities. In 2015, she called for an end to the federal prohibition of medical cannabis.

In April 2018, after reports that the Justice Department was blocking the Drug Enforcement Administration from taking action on over two dozen requests to grow cannabis for use in research, Harris and Senator Orrin Hatch sent a letter to Attorney General Jeff Sessions asserting the necessity of cannabis research "for evidence-based decision making" and "to resolve critical questions of public health and safety, such as learning the impacts of marijuana on developing brains and formulating methods to test marijuana impairment in drivers".

In May 2018, Harris co-sponsored the Marijuana Justice Act (originally introduced by Senator Cory Booker in August 2017), which, if passed, would have legalized cannabis at the federal level by removing it from the Controlled Substances Act. The bill would have also required federal courts to automatically expunge earlier federal marijuana convictions related to use or possession and would have penalized states that enforce cannabis laws disproportionately against minority or low-income people. In February 2019, as she reintroduced the Marijuana Justice Act, Harris asserted that the U.S. had not equally applied cannabis laws and "criminalized marijuana use in a way that has led to the disproportionate incarceration of young men of color".

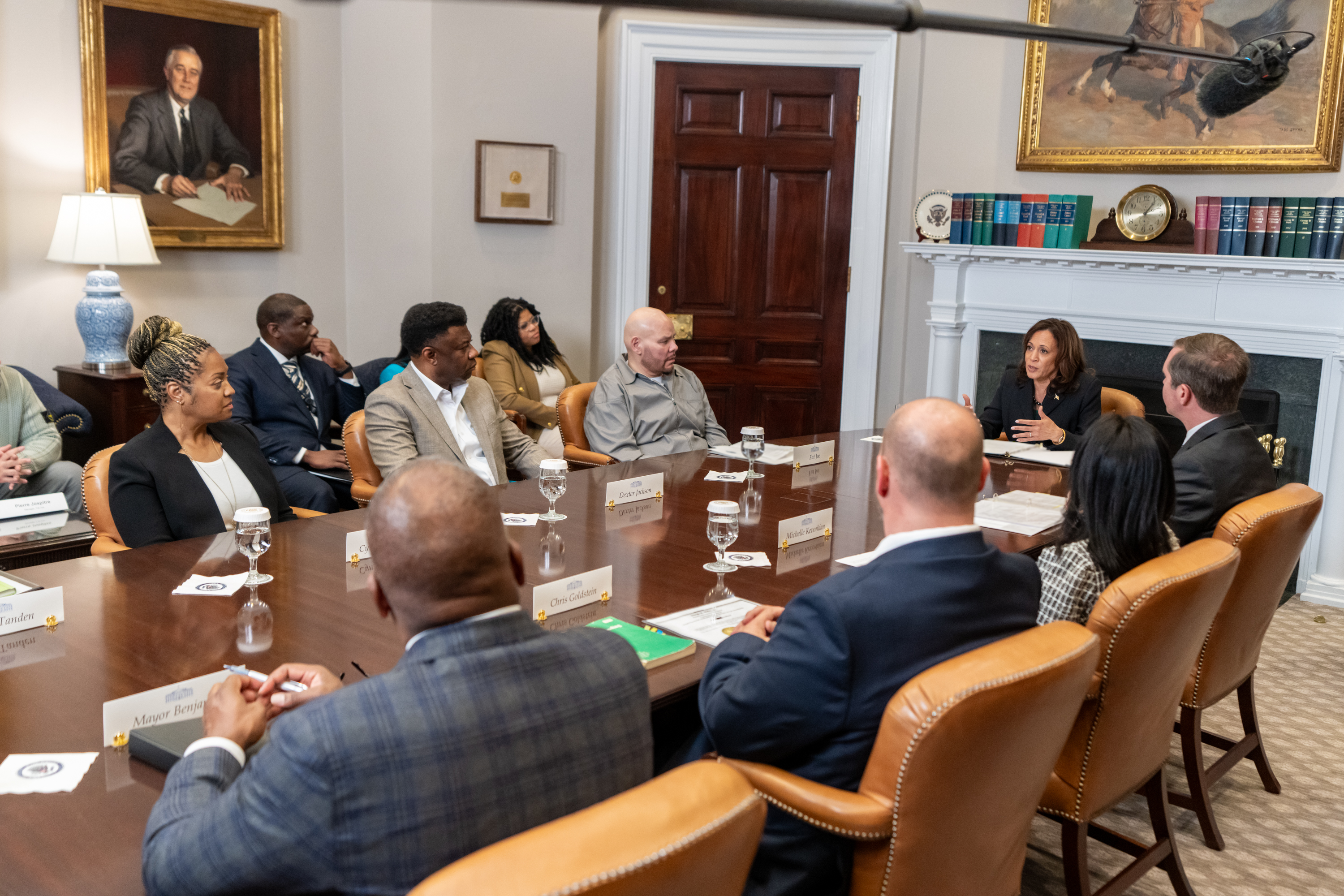
Harris leads a roundtable discussion on cannabis policy reform at the White House in March 2024.

In July 2019, Harris and Representative Jerry Nadler introduced the Marijuana Opportunity Reinvestment and Expungement (MORE) Act, which, like the 2018 bill, would have legalized cannabis on the federal level and expunged low-level cannabis possession convictions, and would have authorized grants to members of communities of color as part of an effort to reverse decades of damage cannabis criminalization had inflicted on that community. In a statement, Harris cited the need to regulate cannabis and ensure "everyone—especially communities of color that have been disproportionately impacted by the war on drugs—has a real opportunity to participate in this growing industry."

=== Education ===
Harris has argued for treating "habitual and chronic truancy" among children in elementary school as a crime committed by the parents of truant children. She argues that there is a direct connection between habitual truancy in elementary school and crime later in life. In 2010, her California attorney general campaign website said she had been endorsed by the California Federation of Teachers.

Harris supports busing to desegregate public schools, saying, "the schools of America are as segregated, if not more segregated, today than when I was in elementary school." She views busing as an option to be considered by school districts, rather than the federal government's responsibility.

Harris supports the creation of a government funding program to pay tuition and fees for students attending public colleges and universities for dependent students whose parents have income of $125,000 or less and independent students with incomes of $125,000 or less. The program would be funded by a 0.5% fee per stock trade on Wall Street firms. Harris proposed having up to $20,000 in student debt forgiven for Pell Grant recipients who start a business and operate it for at least three years in a disadvantaged community. Eligible students would also have loans deferred interest-free for a business formation period of up to three years.

=== Election security ===
On December 21, 2017, Harris was one of six senators to introduce the "Secure Elections Act", legislation authorizing block grants for states that would update outdated voting technology. The bill would have also created a program for an independent panel of experts to develop cybersecurity guidelines for election systems that states could adopt if they choose, and offered states resources to implement the recommendations.

In March 2019, Harris told Jimmy Kimmel that she was open to discussing abolishing the Electoral College given that there was "no question that the popular vote has been diminished in terms of making the final decision about who's the president of the United States and we need to deal with that."

In May 2019, Harris co-sponsored the Protecting American Votes and Elections (PAVE) Act, legislation that would have granted the United States Department of Homeland Security the authority "to set minimum cybersecurity standards for U.S. voting machines, authorized a one-time $500 million grant program for states to buy ballot-scanning machines to count paper ballots, and required states to conduct risk-limiting audits of all federal elections in order to detect any cyber hacks".

=== Gun control ===
Harris has consistently supported gun control and has received an "F" rating from the pro-gun NRA Political Victory Fund. As district attorney in San Francisco, Harris, along with other district attorneys, filed an amicus brief in District of Columbia v. Heller arguing the Washington, D.C. gun law at issue did not violate the Second Amendment.

During her 2016 campaign for Senate, Harris was endorsed by the Brady Campaign to Prevent Gun Violence. Former U.S. Representative Gabby Giffords, founder of the Giffords Center for Violence Intervention, endorsed her in 2016 and 2024, saying at an event on July 25, 2024, that the upcoming election was a "choice between Harris, who would sign a ban on assault weapons, and more gun violence under Trump, who gun-rights groups back." In response to the 2017 Las Vegas shooting, Harris supported the call for more gun control. Saying thoughts and prayers are an inadequate answer to the shooting, she said, "we must also commit ourselves to action. Another moment of silence won't suffice."

In November 2017, Harris co-sponsored the Military Domestic Violence Reporting Enhancement Act, a bill that would have established a charge of Domestic Violence under the Uniform Code of Military Justice (UCMJ) and stipulated that convictions would have to be reported within three days to federal databases with the authority to keep abusers from buying firearms in an attempt to close a loophole in the UCMJ through which convicted abusers can do so.

In January 2019, Harris joined Bernie Sanders and 38 other Senate Democrats in introducing the Background Check Expansion Act, a bill that would have required background checks for either the sale or transfer of all firearms, including unlicensed sellers. Exceptions to the bill's background check requirement included transfers between members of law enforcement, loaning firearms for either hunting or sporting events on a temporary basis, providing firearms as gifts to members of one's immediate family, firearms transferred as part of an inheritance, or giving a firearm to another person temporarily for immediate self-defense.

In May 2019, Harris was one of ten Democratic senators to sign a letter to Facebook chairman and CEO Mark Zuckerberg about social media users being "able to facilitate firearm transactions by directing potential buyers to other methods of communication" despite Instagram banning gun sales on its platforms, demanding to know how Facebook governs its own ban on gun sales and holds violators of its policy accountable.

During a 2019 appearance on The Tonight Show Starring Jimmy Fallon, Harris explained her support for a mandatory buyback on assault weapons: "I do believe that we need to do buybacks, and I'll tell you why... First of all, let's be clear about what assault weapons are. They have been designed to kill a lot of human beings quickly. They are weapons of war with no place on the streets of a civil society." CNN reported in May 2019 that "Harris' new proposal "would ban AR-15-style assault weapon imports".

On August 14, 2019, Harris unveiled a plan to address domestic terrorism while prioritizing increasing the difficulty for suspects to obtain or keep firearms by forming domestic terrorism prevention orders meant to empower law enforcement officers and family members with the ability to petition federal courts for a temporary restriction on a person's access to firearms if they "exhibit clear evidence of dangerousness". Harris said "loaded guns should not be a few clicks away for any domestic terrorist with a laptop or smartphone" and cited the "need to take action to keep guns out of the hands of dangerous people and stop violent, hate-fueled attacks before they happen".

=== Immigration ===
Harris has promised to fight for "strong border security" coupled with an earned pathway to citizenship. After an August 2024 interview, immigration activists described Harris as positioning herself to be "tougher on immigration than Trump". Harris has highlighted her work in combating transnational gangs, drug cartels, and human traffickers while attorney general.

In 2023, as vice president, Harris announced pledges of $950 million from private companies into Central American communities to address the causes of mass migration, such as poverty. Also as vice president, she supported a bipartisan bill, the S.4361 - Border Act of 2024, that would have funded additional border agents and closed the border if it was too crowded. Trump called on House and Senate Republicans to kill the bill, arguing that it would hurt his and other Republicans' reelection chances and prevent them from using immigration as a campaign issue. On the campaign trail, Harris has criticized Trump for opposing the bill and promised to sign it into law as president.

Harris has said she believes the immigration system is "broken" and needs to be fixed, and that most Americans also believe this. A campaign video introduced on July 30, 2024, says, "Kamala Harris supports increasing the number of Border Patrol agents" and paints Trump as unserious on border security.

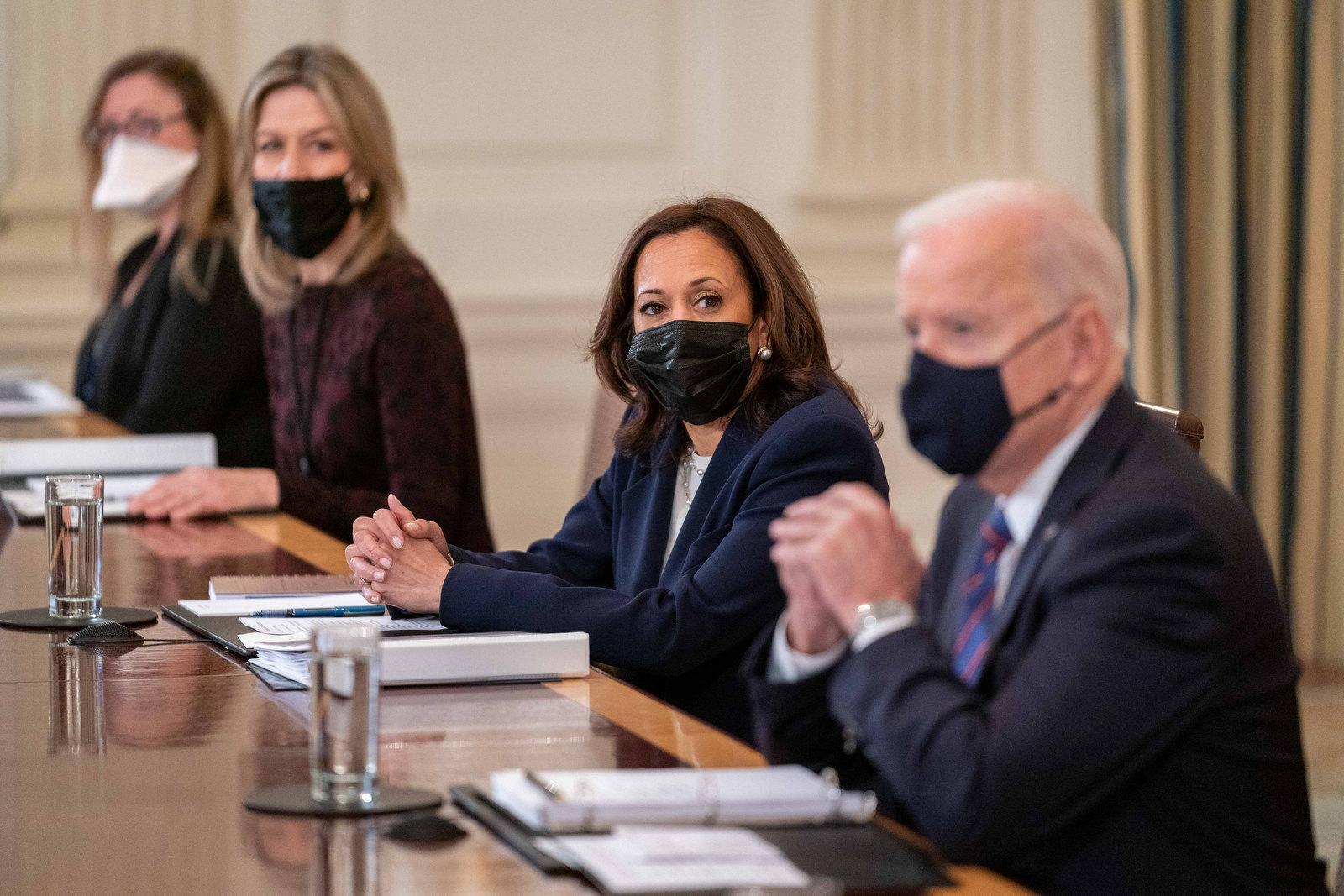
Vice President Harris looks on to President Joe Biden during a meeting on immigration in the State Dining Room of the White House, March 2021.

As a senator, Harris was an outspoken critic of the Trump administration's treatment of people, especially pregnant women, trying to immigrate to the U.S. or seeking asylum in the U.S. In April 2018, she was one of five senators to send a letter to Thomas Homan, acting director of Immigration and Customs Enforcement (ICE), on standards the agency used to determine how to detain a pregnant woman, requesting that pregnant women not be held in custody except under extraordinary standards after reports "that ICE has failed to provide critical medical care to pregnant women in immigration detention – resulting in miscarriages and other negative health outcomes." In July 2018, Harris was one of 22 senators to sponsor the Stop Shackling and Detaining Pregnant Women Act, which would have prohibited immigration officers from detaining pregnant women in most circumstances and improved conditions of care for people in custody. Harris and others wrote a letter to ICE and Customs and Border Enforcement asserting that "the civil detention of an expectant mother for potential immigration offenses is never justified" due to the "absence of compelling evidence that the detention of a pregnant woman is necessary because she is a threat to herself or others, or is a threat to public safety or national security." The senators requested that the CBP enact measures to ensure "timely and appropriate treatment" for pregnant women in custody and that both agencies provide information on how available facilities and doctors are to pregnant immigrants and complete data on the number of those in custody. She and other Democrats wrote a letter to United States Secretary of Homeland Security Kirstjen Nielsen demanding that the Trump administration take immediate action to reunite 539 migrant children with their families, saying that each day of inaction intensified "trauma that this administration has needlessly caused for children and their families seeking humanitarian protection." Harris, Kirsten Gillibrand, and Amy Klobuchar sent a letter to the Office of Refugee Resettlement saying that the agency "should be prioritizing reunification of every child as soon as possible, but instead, it has been responsible for policies that are forcing longer stays in government custody for children", and that it was mandatory that the office "ensure that the custody and processing of [unaccompanied migrant children] is meeting the minimum standards required by domestic and international law."

Harris co-sponsored the Coronavirus Immigrant Families Protection Act, legislation that would have provided dedicated funding for the Centers for Disease Control and Prevention in its efforts for public outreach in multiple languages to hard-to-reach populations to ensure vulnerable communities are granted access to COVID-19 relief measures and public health information. The bill would have also modified immigration policies deterring immigrants from receiving COVID-related medical care.

Harris, Senator Dianne Feinstein, and Representative Juan Vargas sent a letter to the Department of Homeland Security Office of the inspector general requesting an investigation into the way detainees are treated at the Otay Mesa Detention Center after reports that they were required to sign contracts to receive masks, writing that they were "in a public health crisis, and it is our duty to protect the health and safety of every individual, especially those who are in custody and unable to take precautions on their own".

Harris has expressed support for the DREAM Act and said that as president she would push for comprehensive immigration reform with an immigration plan that includes renewal and expansion of DACA, allowing undocumented parents, siblings, and spouses of U.S. citizens or lawful permanent residents to seek deportation relief, and using executive actions to undo technical barriers that prevent many Dreamers from receiving legal status by applying for a green card.

In response to November 2019 NBC News reports that between 2012 and 2017 ICE had put thousands of immigrants in solitary confinement, some of whom had not violated any detention center rules, Harris, Cory Booker, and Dick Durbin introduced legislation to prevent ICE from overusing solitary confinement. Harris said the bill required "ICE to comply with specific safeguards to ensure individuals are treated more humanely and ICE is not adding to the trauma many of these people have already been subjected to."

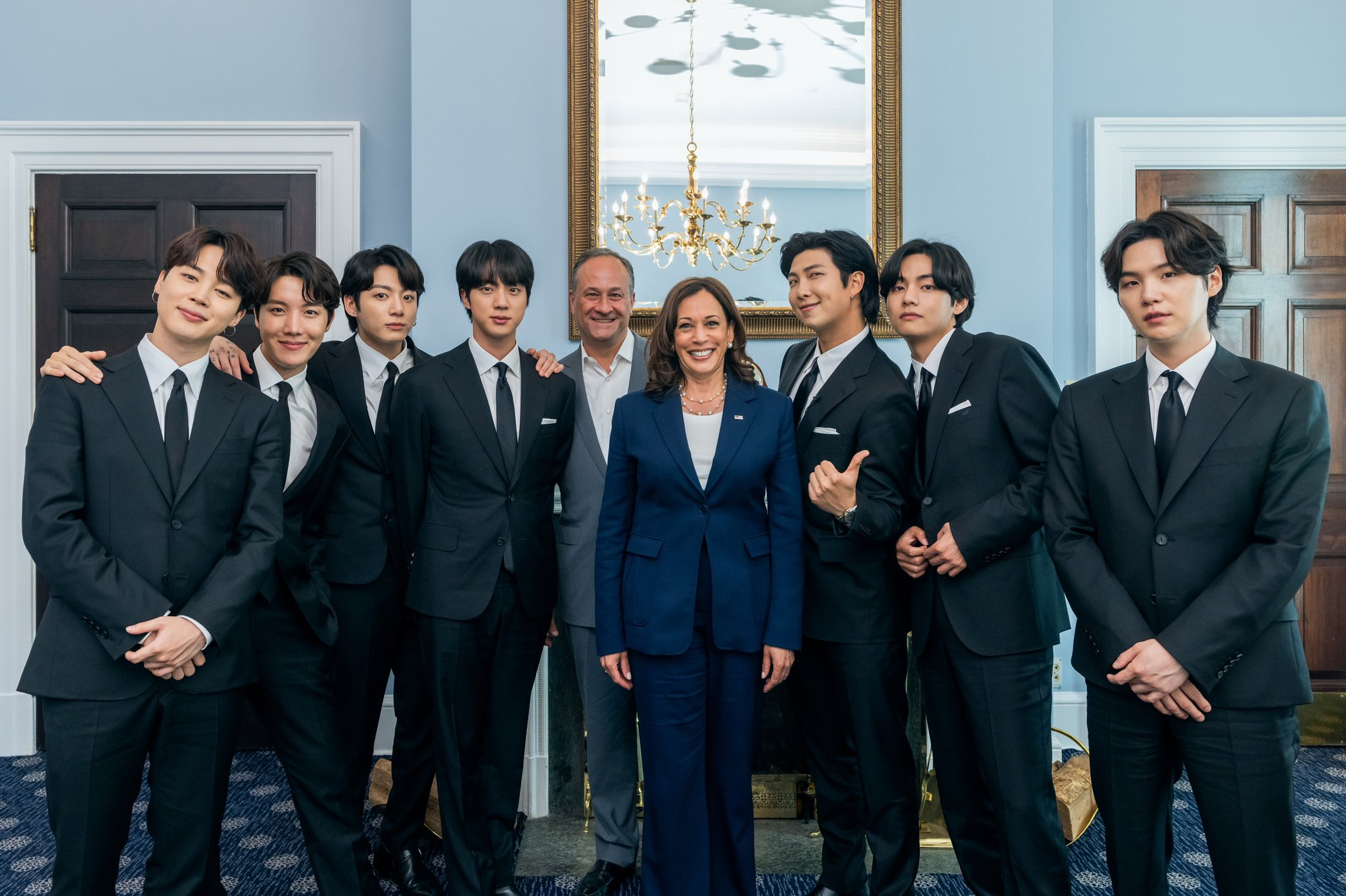
BTS met with Vice President Harris and Second Gentleman Doug Emhoff to discuss the importance of standing up against anti-Asian hate crimes and discrimination, May 2022.

Several senators including Harris signed a letter to U.S. defense secretary James Mattis about "the overt politicization of the military" with the Trump administration's deployment of 5,800 troops to the U.S.–Mexico border and requesting a briefing and written justification from the U.S. Northern Command for troop deployment, while urging Mattis to "curb the unprecedented escalation of DOD involvement in immigration enforcement."

In January 2019, Harris was one of 20 senators to sponsor the Dreamer Confidentiality Act, a bill that would have banned the Department of Homeland Security (DHS) from passing information collected on DACA recipients to ICE, CBP, the Department of Justice, or any other law enforcement agency except in cases of fraudulent claims, national security issues, or non-immigration-related felonies.

In June that year, after the U.S. Department of Housing and Urban Development's confirmed that DACA recipients did not meet eligibility for federal backed loans, Harris and 11 other senators introduced The Home Ownership Dreamers Act, legislation that would have prevented the Federal Housing Administration, Fannie Mae, Freddie Mac, or the Agriculture Department from denying mortgages solely on the basis of an applicant's immigration status.

Harris and 15 other Senate Democrats introduced the Protecting Sensitive Locations Act, which would have mandated that ICE agents get approval from a supervisor before engaging in enforcement actions at sensitive locations except under special circumstances and that agents receive annual training in addition to being required to annually report enforcement actions in those locations.

In August 2019, after the Trump administration released a new regulation imposing the possibility that any green card and visa applicants could be turned down if they had low incomes or little education or had used benefits such as food stamps and housing vouchers, Harris called the regulation part of Trump's ongoing campaign "to vilify a whole group of people" and cited Trump's sending of service members to the southern border and building a border wall as part of his goal to distract "from the fact that he has betrayed so many people and has actually done very little that has been productive in the best interest of American families."

In July 2018, the Trump administration falsely accused Harris of "supporting the animals of MS-13." She responded, "As a career prosecutor, I actually went after gangs and transnational criminal organizations. That's being a leader on public safety. What is not is ripping babies from their mothers."

On October 25, 2017, Harris said she would not support a spending bill until Congress addressed the Deferred Action for Childhood Arrivals (DACA) program in a way that clarified "what we are going to do to protect and take care of our DACA young people in this country." She did not support a February 2018 proposal by some Democrats to provide Trump with $25 billion in funding for a border wall in exchange for giving Dreamers a pathway to citizenship.

In January 2018, Harris and three other Democratic senators co-sponsored the Border and Port Security Act, legislation that would have mandated that CBP "hire, train, and assign at least 500 officers per year until the number of needed positions the model identifies is filled" and required the CMP commissioner to determine potential equipment and infrastructure improvements that could be used for ports of entry.

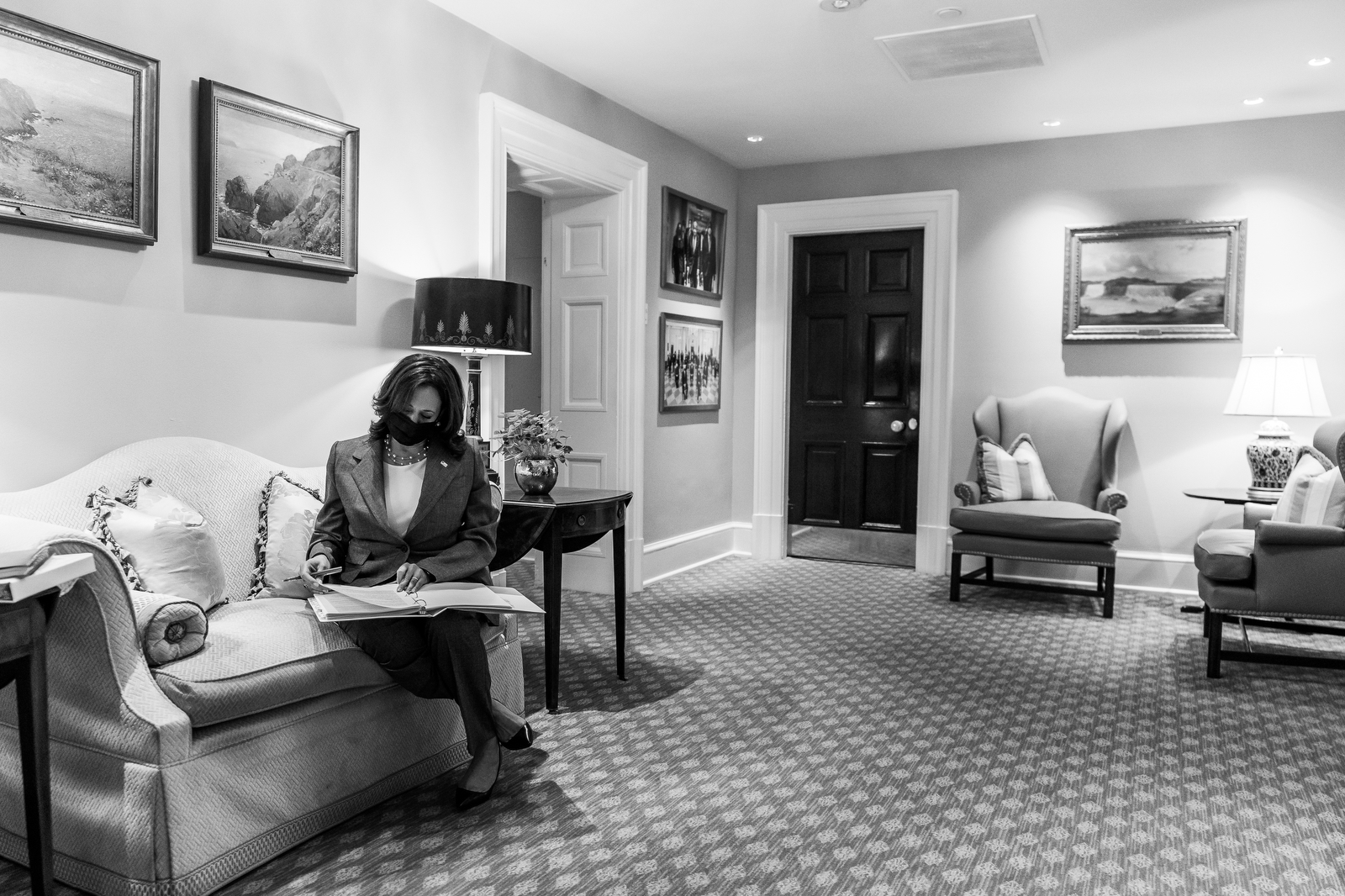
Vice President Harris reviews notes in the West Wing of the White House, April 2021.

In 2006, as San Francisco's district attorney, Harris expressed support for the city's sanctuary city policy of not inquiring about immigration status in the process of a criminal investigation, saying it allowed people to come forward as witnesses to crimes when they might not have otherwise. She argued it is important that immigrants be able to talk with law enforcement without fear.

In September 2024, a questionnaire Harris filled out in 2019 for the American Civil Liberties Union became the subject of attention. In it, as a 2020 presidential candidate, she expressed support for sweeping reductions to ICE operations, including drastic cuts in funding and an open-ended pledge to "end" immigration detention. She also wrote that she supported government funding for gender transition surgery for detained immigrants and federal prisoners.

=== Internet privacy and net neutrality ===
In September 2017, Harris was one of nine senators to sign a letter to Federal Communications Commission chairman Ajit Pai that charged the FCC with failing "to provide stakeholders with an opportunity to comment on the tens of thousands of filed complaints that directly shed light on proposed changes to existing net neutrality protections."

In March 2018, Harris was one of 10 senators to sign a letter spearheaded by Jeff Merkley lambasting Pai's proposal to curb the scope of benefits from the Lifeline program during a period when roughly 6.5 million people in poor communities relied on Lifeline to receive access to high-speed Internet, saying it was Pai's "obligation to the American public, as the Chairman of the Federal Communications Commission, to improve the Lifeline program and ensure that more Americans can afford access, and have means of access, to broadband and phone service." The senators also advocated insuring that "Lifeline reaches more Americans in need of access to communication services."

=== LGBT rights ===
As California Attorney General, Harris refused to defend Prop 8 in federal court, and after Prop 8 was struck down in Hollingsworth v. Perry in 2013, she called the Los Angeles County Clerk's office, ordering it to "start the marriages immediately". She later officiated at the wedding of the plaintiffs in the case, Kris Perry and Sandy Stier, at San Francisco City Hall.

As a member of the U.S. Senate, Harris co-sponsored the Equality Act.

In July 2018, Harris led her colleagues in introducing the Gay and Trans Panic Defense Prohibition Act of 2018, a nationwide bill that would curtail the effectiveness of the so-called gay and trans panic defenses, an issue she pioneered as District Attorney of San Francisco.

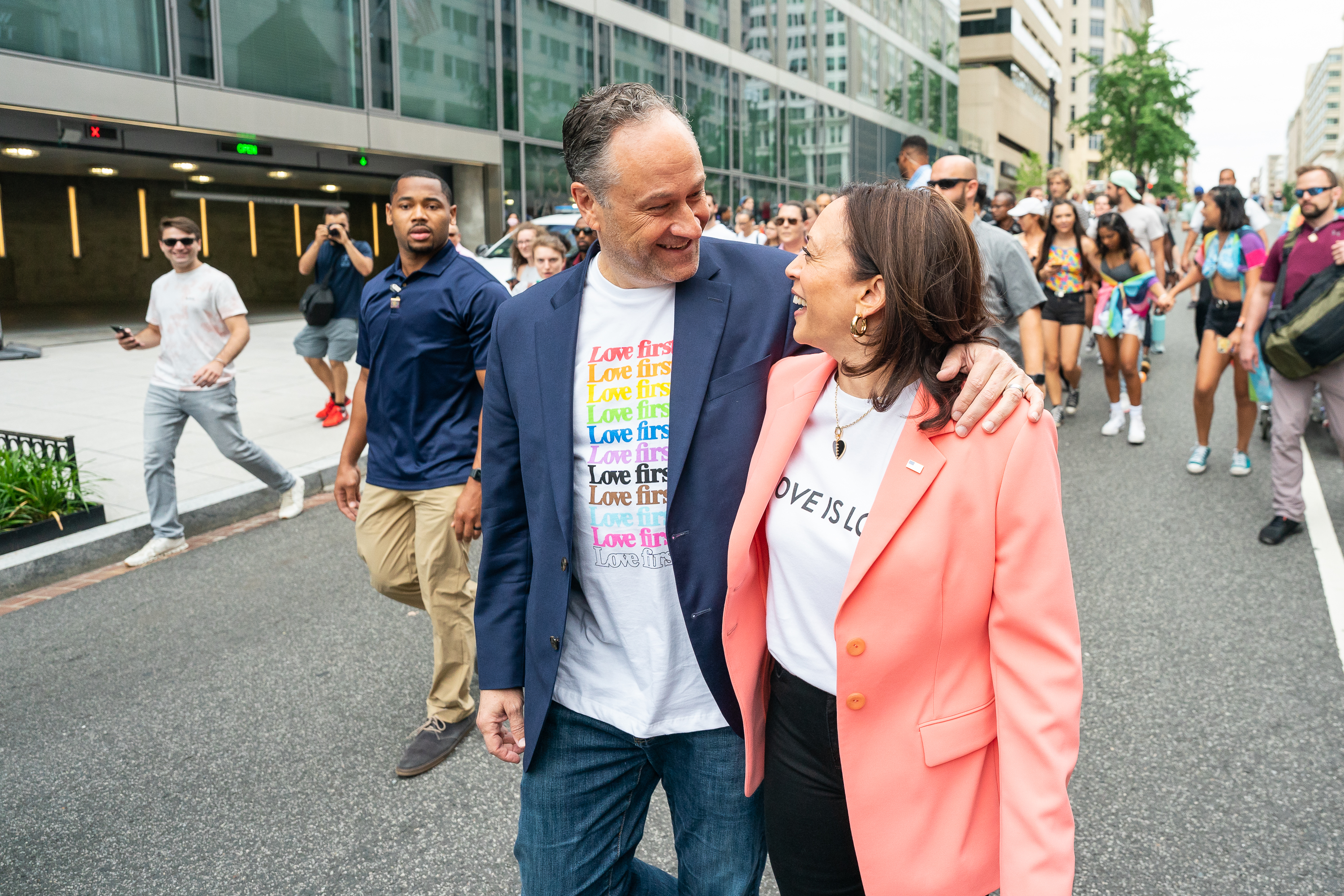
Harris becomes the first sitting vice president to attend a Pride Parade, June 2021.

In October 2019, Harris participated in a CNN/Human Rights Campaign town hall on LGBTQ rights and pledged her support for "all of the folks who are fighting for equality" in cases that would determine whether gay and transgender people are protected under laws banning federal workplace discrimination. Harris drew attention to the epidemic of hate crimes committed against Black trans women (at the time 20 killed that year), noting that LGBTQ people of color are doubly discriminated against.

Harris has since been criticized for a 2015 federal court motion she filed to block gender-affirming medical care for a transgender inmate serving in a California state prison while she was California Attorney General, after the Ninth Circuit Court of Appeals had ruled that denying that treatment violated the 8th Amendment's prohibition of cruel and unusual punishment.

=== Sex workers ===
As district attorney in 2008, Harris opposed Prop K, a San Francisco ballot measure to decriminalize sex work, calling it "completely ridiculous". As attorney general, she led the charge against Backpage, an online classifieds service that had a subsection for escorts. In 2016, Harris filed charges against the site, leading to the arrest of the CEO and the removal of its adult section. Harris also co-sponsored the Stop Enabling Sex Traffickers Act (SESTA), an anti-sex trafficking law, which holds websites responsible for third-party ads.

In a 2019 interview with The Root, Harris said her position on sex work had relaxed. Asked whether she thought it should be decriminalized, she said: "I think so. I do." She then said she had prioritized arresting pimps and johns over sex workers. According to Rolling Stone, her comments were viewed as support for partial decriminalization, akin to the Nordic approach to sex work.

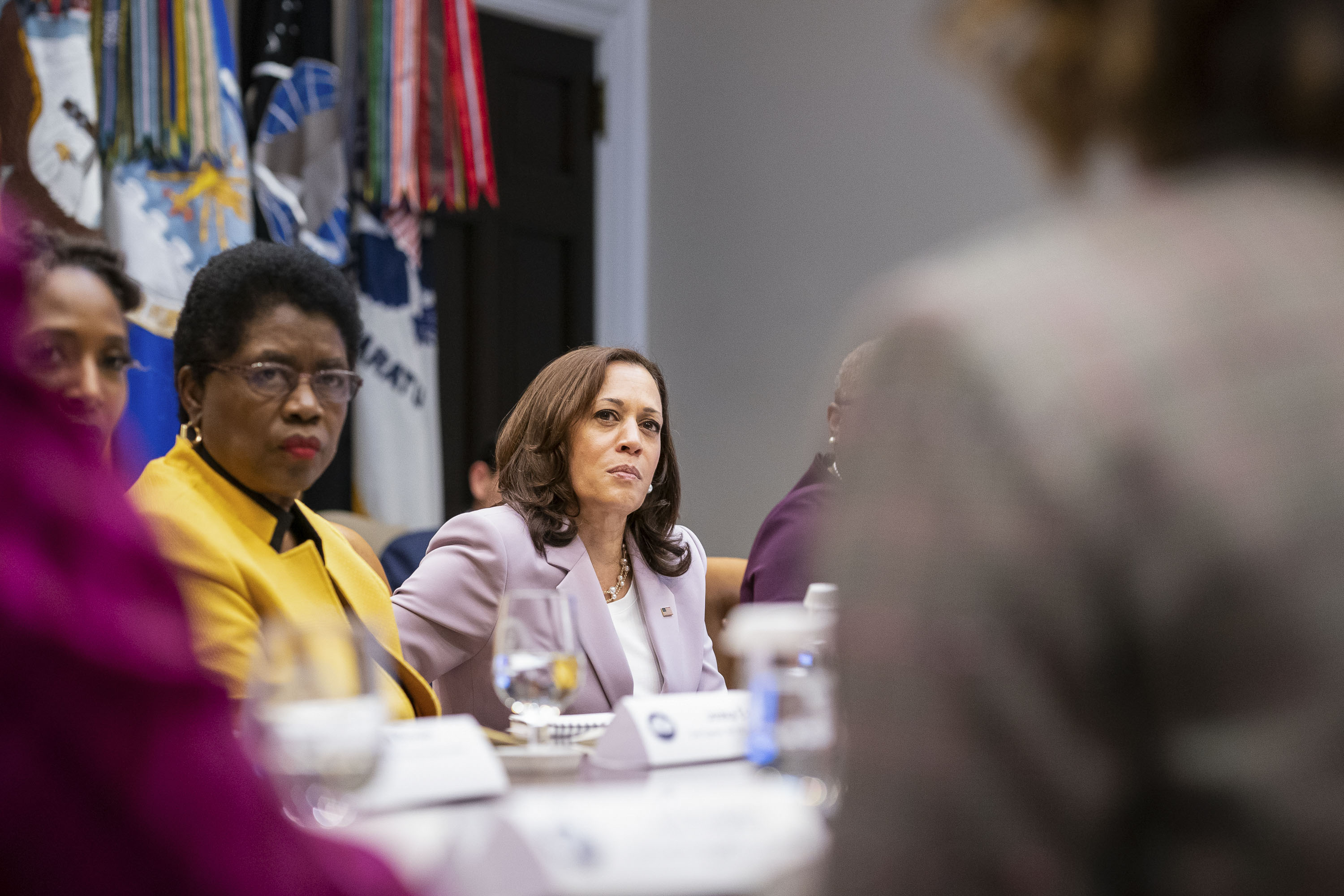
Vice President Kamala Harris listens during a meeting with Black women leaders on Voting Rights, July 2021.

=== Voting rights ===
Harris attributed the 2018 gubernatorial losses of Stacey Abrams and Andrew Gillum, in Georgia and Florida respectively, to voter suppression.

In 2020, Harris and Representatives Jim Clyburn and Marcia Fudge introduced the Vote Safe Act, which proposed uniform national standards for all registered voters to use mail-in absentee voting, a minimum early in-person voting period of 20 days, and $5 billion in funding and grants for states to increase the safety and availability of voting during the COVID-19 pandemic. The ACLU endorsed the bill.

== Economic issues ==
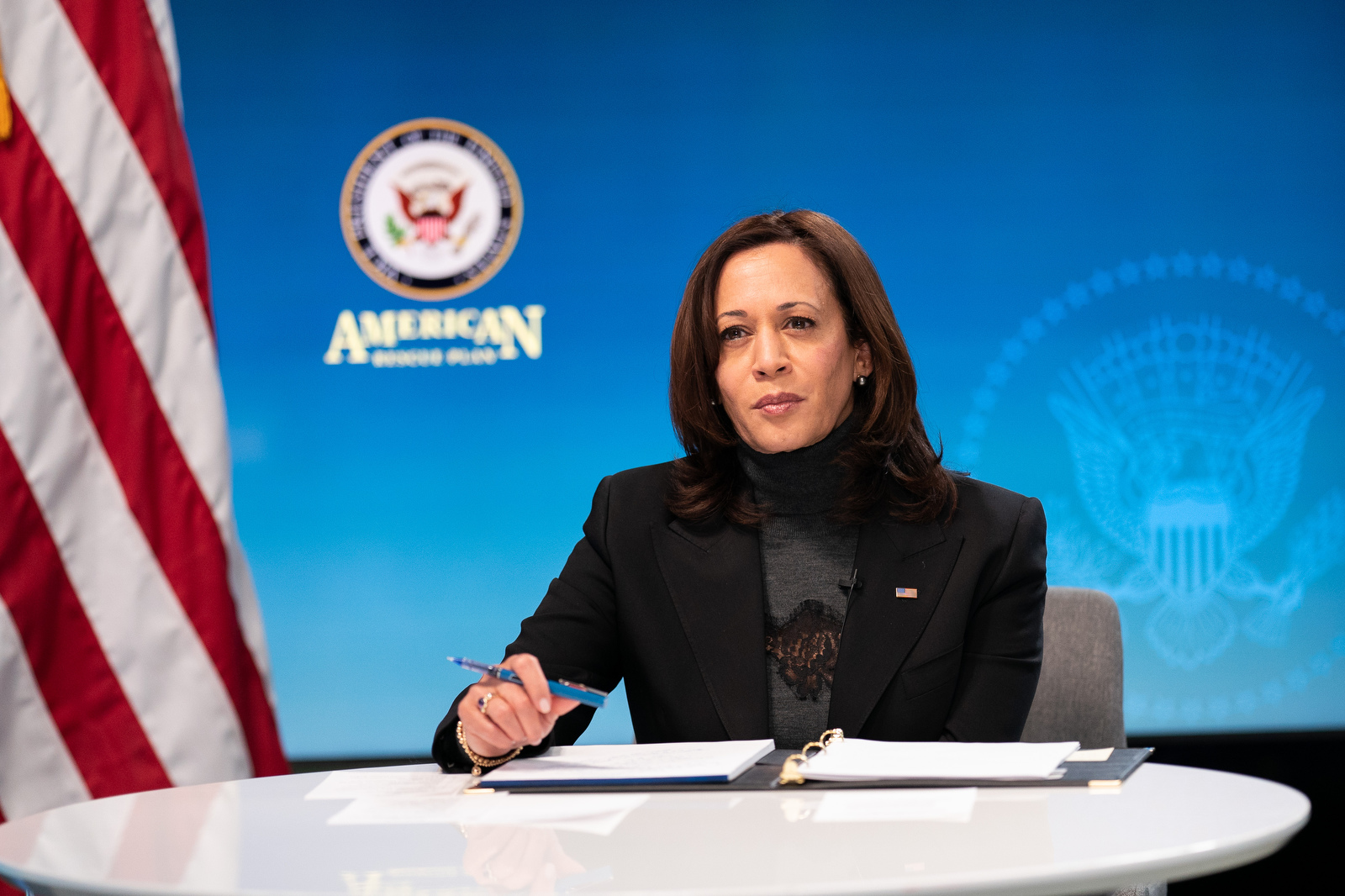
Kamala Harris participates in a virtual roundtable on the American Rescue Plan, 2021.

Harris has said "I believe in capitalism, but capitalism is not working for most people" and that she is not a socialist but insists that more needs to be done to ensure equal opportunities, particularly for working people.

=== Campaign finance ===
Harris's 2020 presidential campaign disavowed most corporate donations and committed to rejecting money from corporate political action committees, instead relying on individual donors.

Our campaign is not taking a dime from corporate PACs or lobbyists—and that was a very deliberate choice.

Harris, along with candidates Cory Booker, Julian Castro, Tulsi Gabbard, Kirsten Gillibrand, Amy Klobuchar, Bernie Sanders, Elizabeth Warren, and Marianne Williamson, explicitly discouraged single-candidate super PACs from operating on her behalf, though she cannot prevent them from doing so.

=== COVID-19 ===
In April 2020, Harris, Representative Adam Schiff, and Senator Dianne Feinstein unveiled legislation to establish a bipartisan commission to review the U.S. response to the COVID-19 pandemic, similar to the 9/11 Commission and the Pearl Harbor Commission. Harris and her colleagues also sent a letter to the Trump administration's health officials demanding a consistent protocol for counting the number of casualties the virus caused to prevent deflation and underreporting of deaths.

Harris announced that she would introduce legislation to create a task force that would address racial disparities, the COVID-19 Racial and Ethnic Disparities Task Force Act. Under the law, the U.S. Department of Health and Human Services would be empowered to make recommendations about effective distribution of resources to communities suffering from racial and ethnic disparities in COVID-19 infection, hospitalization, and death rates. Representative Robin Kelly introduced a companion bill in the House.

Harris and Senator Kirsten Gillibrand introduced a bill to expand by 30% access to the Supplemental Nutrition Assistance Program, commonly known as food stamps. Harris and Republican senator Tim Scott also introduced a bipartisan bill, with the support of chef José Andrés, to expand eligibility for assistance from FEMA, allowing state and local governments to partner with restaurants and nonprofit groups to feed those in need during the pandemic. Harris also introduced a bill with senators Bernie Sanders and Ed Markey to give Americans a monthly payment of $2,000 during the pandemic, with payments to every U.S. resident earning up to $120,000 as the unemployment rate spiked to 14.7%.

=== Disaster relief ===
In October 2017, after Hurricane Maria and Hurricane Irma, Harris signed a letter to acting secretary of homeland security Elaine Duke urging her "to provide all necessary resources to confirm that storm-related deaths are being counted correctly" given that President Trump seemed "to be using the number of fatalities to determine the quality of the disaster response."

In August 2018, Harris was one of eight senators to sign a letter to the Federal Emergency Management Agency charging the agency with not assisting displaced homeowners in Puerto Rico in the aftermath of Hurricane Maria under the Individuals and Households program (IHP) at "alarming rates."

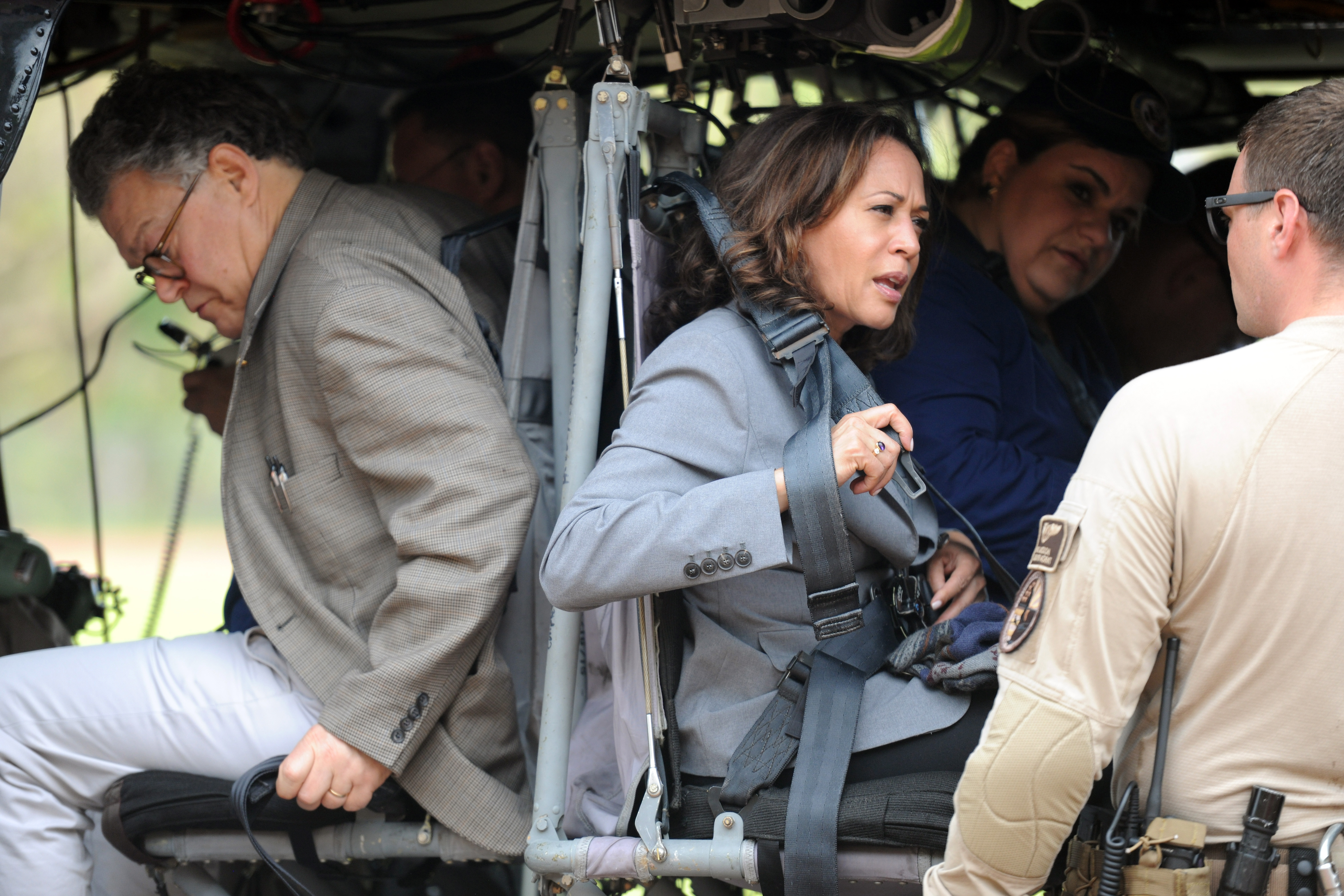
Harris tours Puerto Rico in 2017.

In February 2019, Harris introduced the Protecting Disaster Relief Funds Act, a bill that would prevent Trump from taking funds allocated to the Departments of Homeland Security and Housing and Urban Development or the Army Corps of Engineers for disaster relief and using the funds in construction of physical barriers along the U.S.-Mexico border. She said the bill would "ensure that funds intended for victims of natural disasters do not go towards a wall that Congress won't fund and people on the border don't even want" and "stand up for Congress's power of the purse and help California families affected by recent natural disasters begin the process of recovery."

In March 2019, Harris was one of 11 senators to sign a letter to congressional leaders urging them to "bring legislation providing disaster supplemental appropriations to your respective floors for consideration immediately" after noting that the previous year had seen 124 federal disaster declarations approved for states, territories, and tribal nations across the U.S.

In April 2019, Harris announced her opposition to a Republican disaster aid package, charging the Trump administration with playing "politics with disaster funding by failing to fully assist California wildfire victims and the millions of American citizens still struggling in Puerto Rico and the U.S. Virgin Islands. Survivors of these disasters are hurting, and they deserve immediate and meaningful support—this bill does not do that."

In November 2019, wildfire conditions forced California power companies to begin presumptive public safety power shutoff events. Nearly 800,000 customers were left without electricity for days. People in areas particularly vulnerable to the fires were left with limited means of getting information and supplies. Harris introduced the Wildfire Defense Act, a bill that would invest $1 billion to establish guidelines to create community wildfire defense plans, provide grants of up to $10 million to implement such plans, and establish best practices to protect communities from wildfires.

=== Consumer protection ===
On April 10, 2020, Harris and Senator Elizabeth Warren introduced the Price Gouging Prevention Act, a bill that would empower the Federal Trade Commission to enforce a ban on excessive price increases of consumer goods amid national emergencies and specifically consider any price increase above 10% to be price gouging during such a declaration.

In April 2020, Harris, Senator Sherrod Brown, and Representatives Ayanna Pressley and Gregory Meeks sent the Small Business Administration and Treasury Department a letter requesting that the agencies move to ensure minority-owned businesses remain under the Paycheck Protection Program and calling for the Trump administration to revise guidance on the program to reaffirm that lending institutions comply with fair lending laws and mandate that they report the demographics of program lending.

=== Free trade ===
In 2016, Harris opposed the Trans-Pacific Partnership, saying the proposed trade deal did not do enough to protect workers and the environment, and later spoke against tariffs imposed by the Trump administration.

In May 2019, Harris said she would not have voted for the North American Free Trade Agreement (NAFTA) because "we can do a better job to protect American workers" and called for the U.S. to do "a better job in terms of thinking about the priorities that should be more apparent now than perhaps they were then, which are issues like the climate crisis and what we need to build into these trade agreements."

In September 2019, Harris declared she was not a "protectionist Democrat." In January 2020, she was one of ten senators to vote against the USMCA, saying, "by not confronting climate change, the USMCA fails to meet the crises of the moment."

=== Healthcare ===
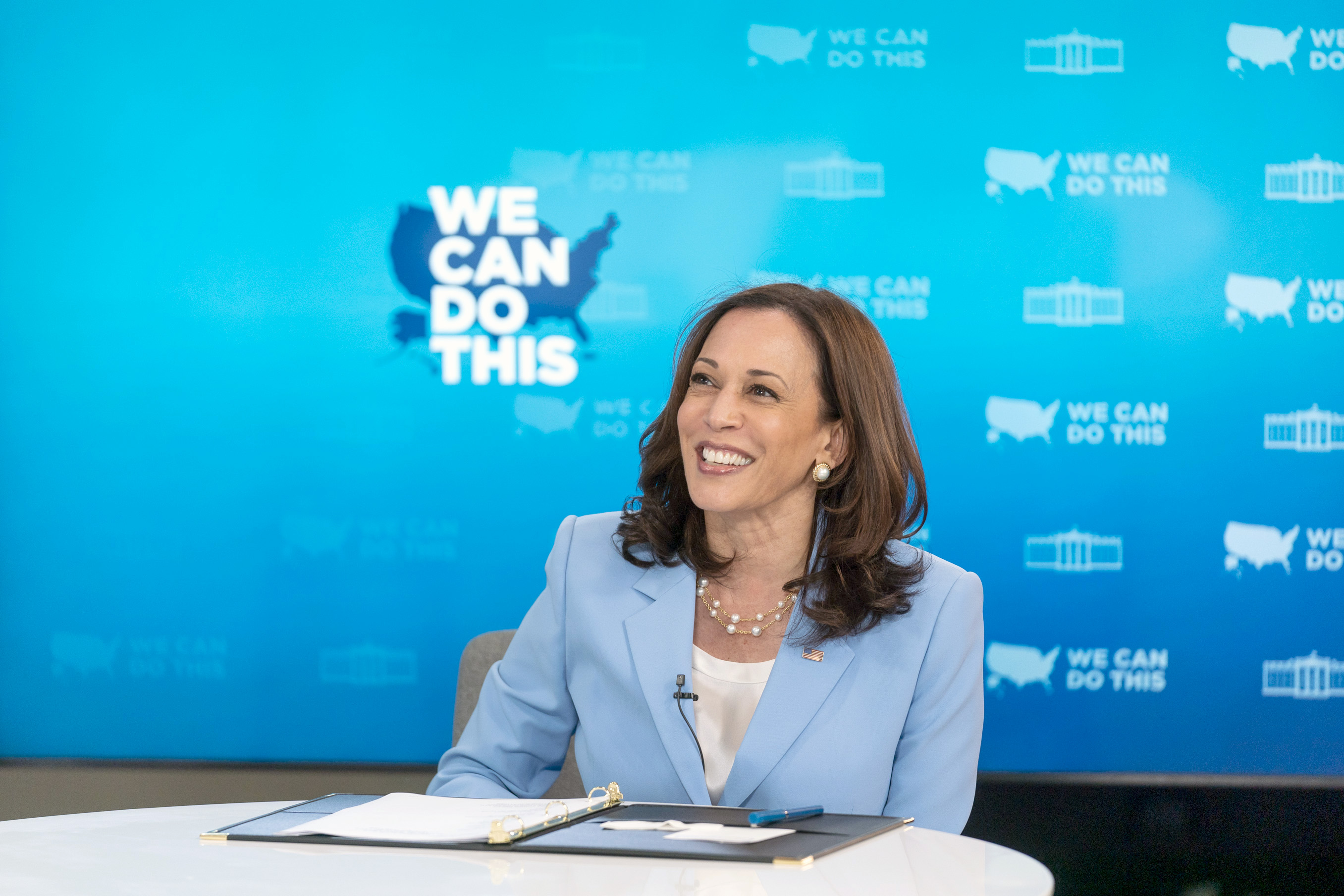
Vice President Kamala Harris delivers remarks during a virtual Vaccine Month of Action in June 2021.

Harris was involved in the following healthcare legislation:

- On August 30, 2017, Harris announced at a town hall in Oakland that she would co-sponsor Senator Bernie Sanders's "Medicare for All" bill, supporting single-payer healthcare.
- In April 2018, Harris was one of ten senators to sponsor the Choose Medicare Act, an expanded public option for health insurance that also increased Affordable Care Act subsidies and rendered people with higher income levels eligible for its assistance.
- In August 2018, Harris introduced the Maternal Care Access and Reducing Emergencies (CARE) Act, a bill designed to reduce racial disparities in maternal mortality and morbidity. The risk of death from pregnancy-related causes for African American women is three to four times higher than for white women, and Black women are twice as likely to have life-threatening pregnancy complications. She was joined by 13 of her Democratic colleagues.
- In December 2018, Harris was one of 42 senators to sign a letter to Trump administration officials Alex Azar, Seema Verma, and Steve Mnuchin arguing that the administration was improperly using Section 1332 of the Affordable Care Act to authorize states to "increase health care costs for millions of consumers, while weakening protections for individuals with pre-existing conditions." The senators requested the administration withdraw the policy and "re-engage with stakeholders, states, and Congress."
- Also in December 2018, Harris was one of the three original co-sponsors of the Combatting Unreasonable Rises and Excessively (CURE) High Drug Prices Act. For medications covered by a federal health care program, CURE prohibited price-gouging by manufacturers of certain prescription drugs. It specified a threshold of percentage price increases at which price-gouging is presumed. The bill did not become law, but later legislation allowed this type of price-gouging ban.
- In February 2019, Harris and 22 other Democratic senators introduced the State Public Option Act, a bill to authorize states to form a Medicaid buy-in program for all residents and thereby allow them to buy into a state-driven Medicaid health insurance plan if they wished. Brian Schatz, a co-sponsor, said the legislation would "unlock each state's Medicaid program to anyone who wants it, giving people a high-quality, low-cost public health insurance option" and that its goal was "to make sure that every single American has comprehensive health care coverage".
- In June 2019, Harris was one of eight senators to co-sponsor the Territories Health Equity Act of 2019, legislation that would remove the cap on annual federal Medicaid funding, increase the federal matching rate for Medicaid expenditures of territories, and provide more funds for prescription drug coverage to low-income seniors in an attempt to equalize funding for Puerto Rico, the Virgin Islands, Guam, American Samoa, and the Northern Mariana Islands with that of U.S. states.
- On July 29, 2019, Harris unveiled a health plan that would expand coverage while preserving a role for private insurance companies. It called for transitioning to a Medicare for All system over 10 years and automatically placing infants and the uninsured into the system while others could buy into the plan. Some Democrats and Republicans criticized the plan.
- In November 2019, during a Morning Joe interview, Harris declined to specify the inconsistencies in Elizabeth Warren's Medicare For All plan, saying that her own plan was superior and that she was "not going to take away people's choice about having a public or a private plan. I am going to give people a transition that allows folks like organized labor to actually renegotiate their contract."
- In April 2020, Harris was one of 28 Democratic senators to sign a letter to the United States Department of Health and Human Services urging it to reopen the Affordable Care Act's online marketplace to help uninsured Americans get health insurance amid the COVID-19 pandemic, opining that opening the marketplace "would provide an easy pathway to coverage for those who under previous circumstances may have decided to forego health insurance or purchase a substandard, junk insurance plan, but now in a global pandemic are in vital need of comprehensive coverage to protect themselves, their families, and our broader community".
- In April 2020, Harris was one of 20 senators to sign a letter to United States Secretary of Health and Human Services Alex Azar about Rick Bright's removal as director of the Research and Development Authority. The senators said it was of "the utmost importance that there be stable leadership within HHS and that decisions are driven by science and the public health" during the pandemic and warned that the U.S. could not have a steady response if its leadership was "being constantly shuffled and if experts are being constrained or removed when they insist on following the science and sticking to the facts."

As vice president, Harris was the tie-breaking vote for the 2022 Inflation Reduction Act, which addresses drug pricing procedures. As a 2024 presidential candidate, she proposes deeper cuts in prescription drug prices. Her plan proposes to use the savings from future price cuts to fund home care for long-term care (LTC) patients on Medicare.

=== Housing ===
- In April 2019, Harris was one of 41 senators to sign a bipartisan letter to the housing subcommittee praising the United States Department of Housing and Urban Development's Section 4 Capacity Building program as authorizing "HUD to partner with national nonprofit community development organizations to provide education, training, and financial support to local community development corporations (CDCs) across the country" and expressing disappointment that Trump's budget "has slated this program for elimination after decades of successful economic and community development." The senators wrote that they hoped the subcommittee would support continued funding for Section 4 in Fiscal Year 2020.
- In November 2019, Harris and Representative Maxine Waters introduced the Housing is Infrastructure Act, a bill that would grant $70 billion for clearing a backlog of repairs and upgrades to federal subsidized housing and $25 billion for grants for affordable housing construction and maintenance in low-income communities, Native American reservations, disaffected rural areas, and vulnerable groups such as the elderly and disabled.

=== Labor unions ===
In the final weeks before the 2010 California Attorney General election, union groups such as California Labor Federation, Service Employees International Union Local 1000 and the California Nurses Association "spent hundreds of thousands of dollars" in an attempt to help Harris defeat Republican nominee Steve Cooley.

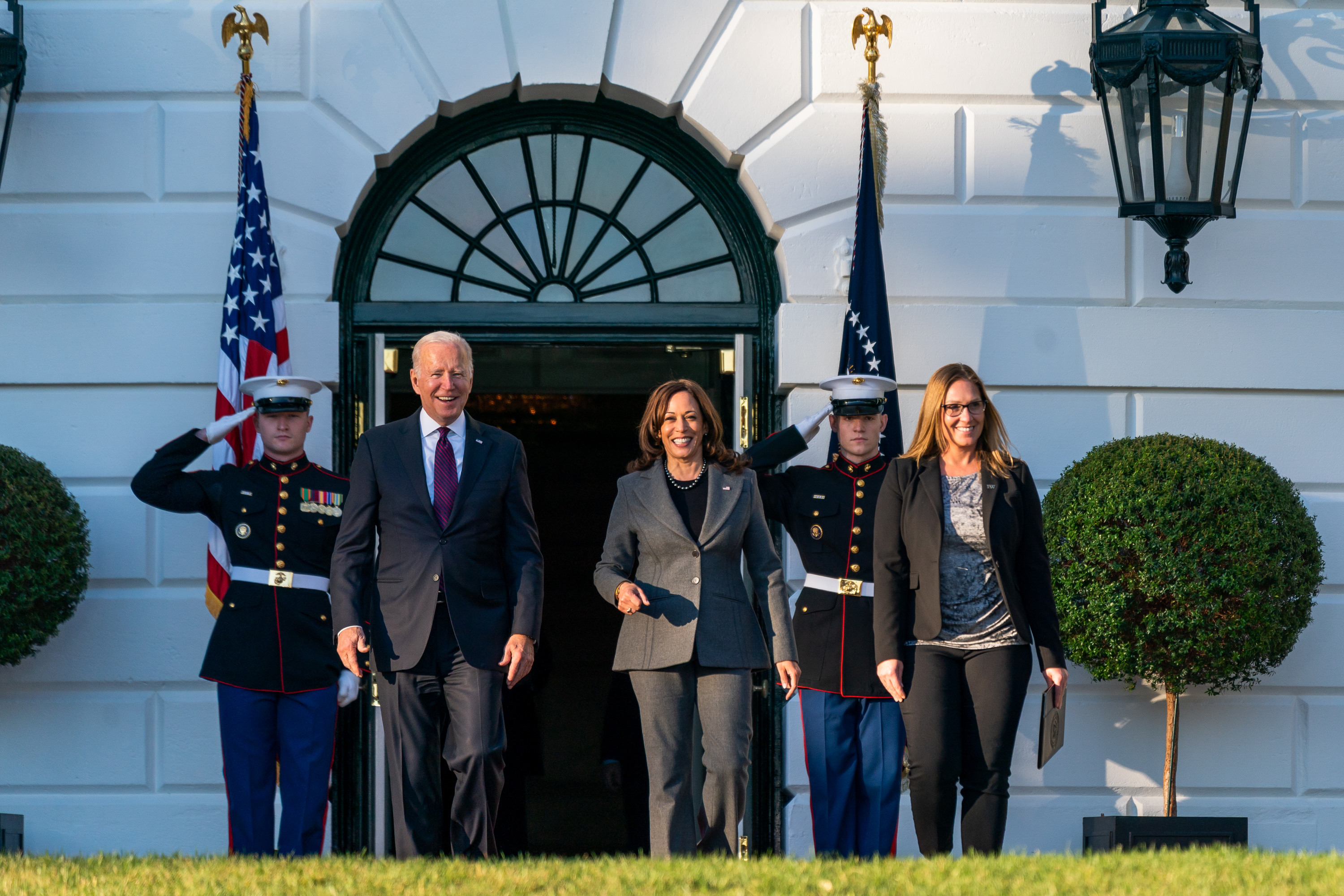
President Joe Biden and Vice President Harris walk out to the South Lawn before signing the Infrastructure Investment and Jobs Act, November 2021.

In May 2018, Harris co-sponsored the Workplace Democracy Act, a bill introduced by Representatives Donald Norcross, Mark Pocan, and Rosa DeLauro and Senator Bernie Sanders intended to help workers bargain for higher wages, benefits, or better working conditions. It included a mandate that there be a union for workers when a majority of them in a bargaining unit sign valid authorization cards to join a union and prevented employers from exploiting workers by mischaracterizing them as independent contractors or denying them overtime.

In June 2018, Harris led seven other senators in sponsoring a bill amending the Fair Labor Standards Act of 1938 to include a mandate forcing farmers to pay workers time and a half for each hour worked past the standard 40-hour work week. She said the bill aimed "to correct some of the injustices they face and guarantee they will get paid for the hours they work, including overtime and minimum wage, which right now they are not entitled to by law."

In April 2019, Harris delivered a speech at a labor dinner honoring state legislators in Sacramento in which she listed workers benefits that would not have been possible without organized labor and condemned rhetoric that calls unions "special-interest groups".

In July 2019, Harris and Representative Pramila Jayapal introduced the Domestic Worker's Bill of Rights. The bill included protections against harassment and discrimination, guarantees for meal breaks, a minimum wage, and overtime pay. Harris said that for too long American workers had "not been afforded the same rights and benefits as nearly every other worker, and we must change that" and that the bill was "an opportunity to bring economic justice and empowerment to millions of domestic workers—particularly those who are immigrants and women of color."

In July 2019, Harris signed a letter to United States Secretary of Labor Alexander Acosta that advocated that the U.S. Occupational Safety and Health Administration fully investigate a complaint filed on May 20 by a group of Chicago-area employees of McDonald's that detailed workplace violence incidents, including customers throwing hot coffee and threatening employees with firearms. The senators argued that McDonald's could and must "do more to protect its employees, but employers will not take seriously their obligations to provide a safe workplace if OSHA does not enforce workers rights to a hazard-free workplace."

In August 2019, Harris delivered a speech at the Nevada State AFL-CIO Convention asserting that workers were benefiting from the American economy and that the U.S. would be stronger if it invested in the American worker.

In August 2019, a bill that would mandate a California Supreme Court ruling that deems a greater share of workers to be employees as opposed to independent contractors be made law was seen as "setting up a clash between organized labor and prominent California companies like Uber and Postmates." Ian Sams, a spokesperson for Harris's 2020 presidential campaign, said Harris supported the bill because "we need to go even further to bolster worker protections and benefits and elevate the voice of workers", adding that she wanted all workers to have a "robust social safety net" and the right to join a union.

=== Paid leave ===
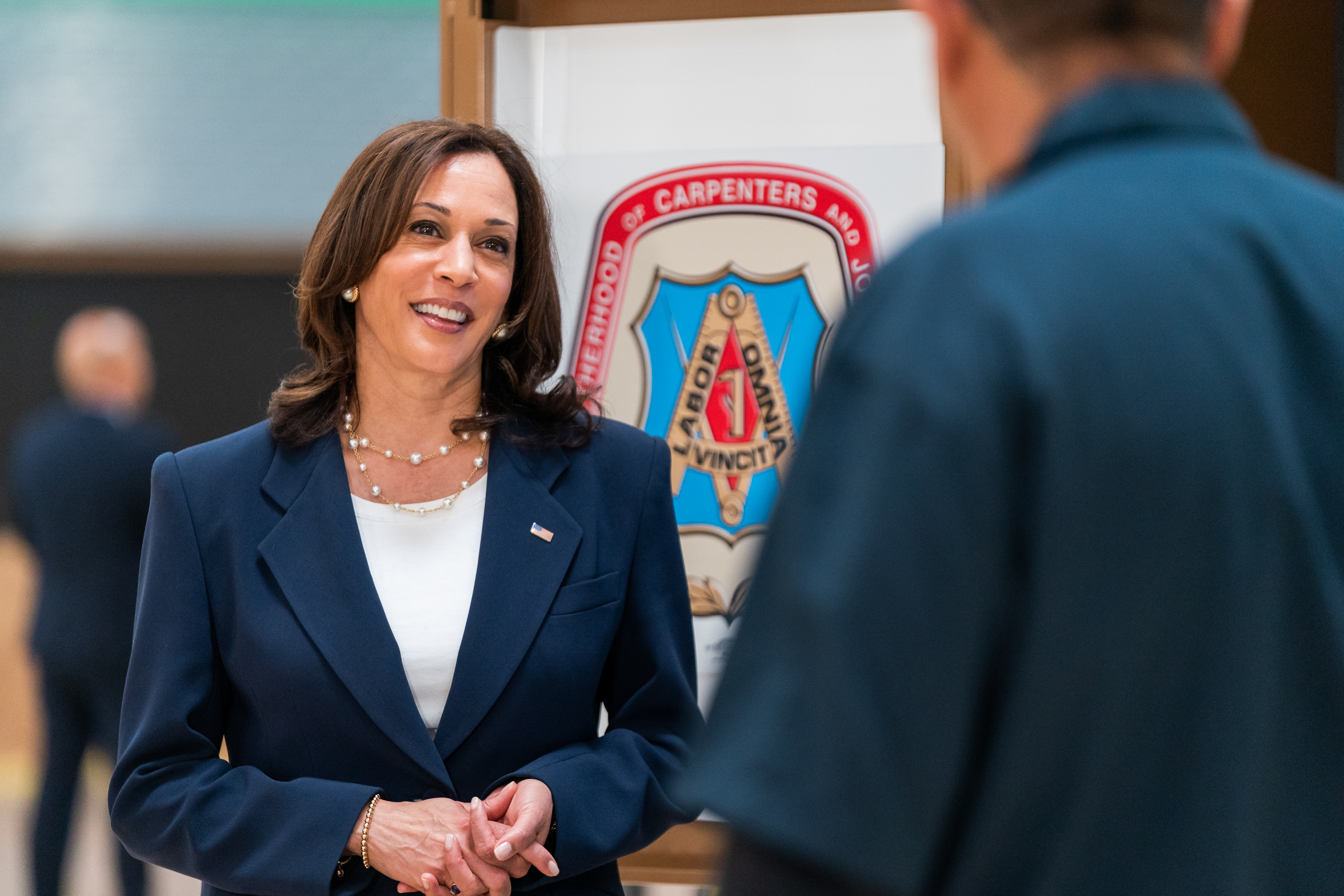
Vice President Harris participates in a tour of the Carpenters International Training Center in Las Vegas, Nevada, July 2021.

On October 7, 2019, Harris unveiled a six-month paid family and medical leave plan that included forming a new Office of Paid Family and Medical Leave that would determine eligibility and authorize benefit payments. Harris's program would be funded through general revenue and payroll contributions and establish a federal Bureau of Children and Family Justice. In a statement, Harris said a guaranteed six-month paid leave would bring the U.S. "closer to economic justice for workers and ensures newborn children or children who are sick can get the care they need from a parent without thrusting the family into upheaval".

=== Small business ===
In May 2020, Harris and Ayanna Pressley introduced the Saving Our Street Act, a bill that would allocate grants of up to $250,000 to businesses with fewer than 10 employees, providing relief to "micro businesses" shut out of the larger coronavirus relief bill. Under the bill, 75% of the $124.5 billion program would go to business and nonprofit owners from underrepresented groups and businesses with less than $1 million in annual gross revenue.

=== Taxes ===
Harris opposed the Tax Cuts and Jobs Act of 2017 and has called for a repeal of the bill's tax cuts for wealthy Americans. In 2018, she proposed a tax cut for most working- and middle-class Americans. An analysis by the nonpartisan Tax Policy Center estimated that the bill would reduce federal revenue by $2.8 trillion over a decade. She proposed to pay for the tax cuts by repealing tax cuts for wealthy Americans and increasing taxes on corporations.

In April 2020, Harris co-sponsored of the All Dependents Count Act, legislation to expand eligibility for the CARES Act's $500 credit per dependent for all taxpayers.

=== Titans of industry ===
In a 2025 interview, Harris said "I always believed that if push came to shove, those titans of industry would be guardrails for our democracy. For the importance of sustaining democratic institutions."

=== United States Postal Service ===
In March 2019, Harris co-sponsored a bipartisan resolution led by Gary Peters and Jerry Moran that opposed privatization of the United States Postal Service (USPS), citing the USPS as an establishment that was self-sustained and noting concerns that privatization could cause higher prices and reduced services for customers, especially in rural communities.

In April 2020, Harris was one of 14 senators to sign a letter led by Cory Booker to Senate Majority Leader Mitch McConnell and Senate Minority Leader Chuck Schumer urging them "to provide appropriate funding to the United States Postal Service (USPS) in the next coronavirus package that Congress takes up" because millions of Americans rely on the USPS for essential goods and duties.

=== Workplace harassment ===
In March 2019, Harris and Republican senator Lisa Murkowski reintroduced the Ending the Monopoly of Power Over Workplace Harassment through Education and Reporting (EMPOWER) Act, a bill that would prohibit non-disclosure and non-disparagement clauses some employers use in employment requirements.

In April 2019, Harris signed on to the Be HEARD Act, legislation intended to abolish the tipped minimum wage and end mandatory arbitration and pre-employment nondisclosure agreements. The bill also gave workers additional time to report harassment and was said by co-sponsor Patty Murray to come at a time when too many workers are "still silenced by mandatory disclosure agreements that prevent them from discussing sexual harassment and long-standing practices like the tipped wages that keep workers in certain industries especially vulnerable."

== Foreign policy ==
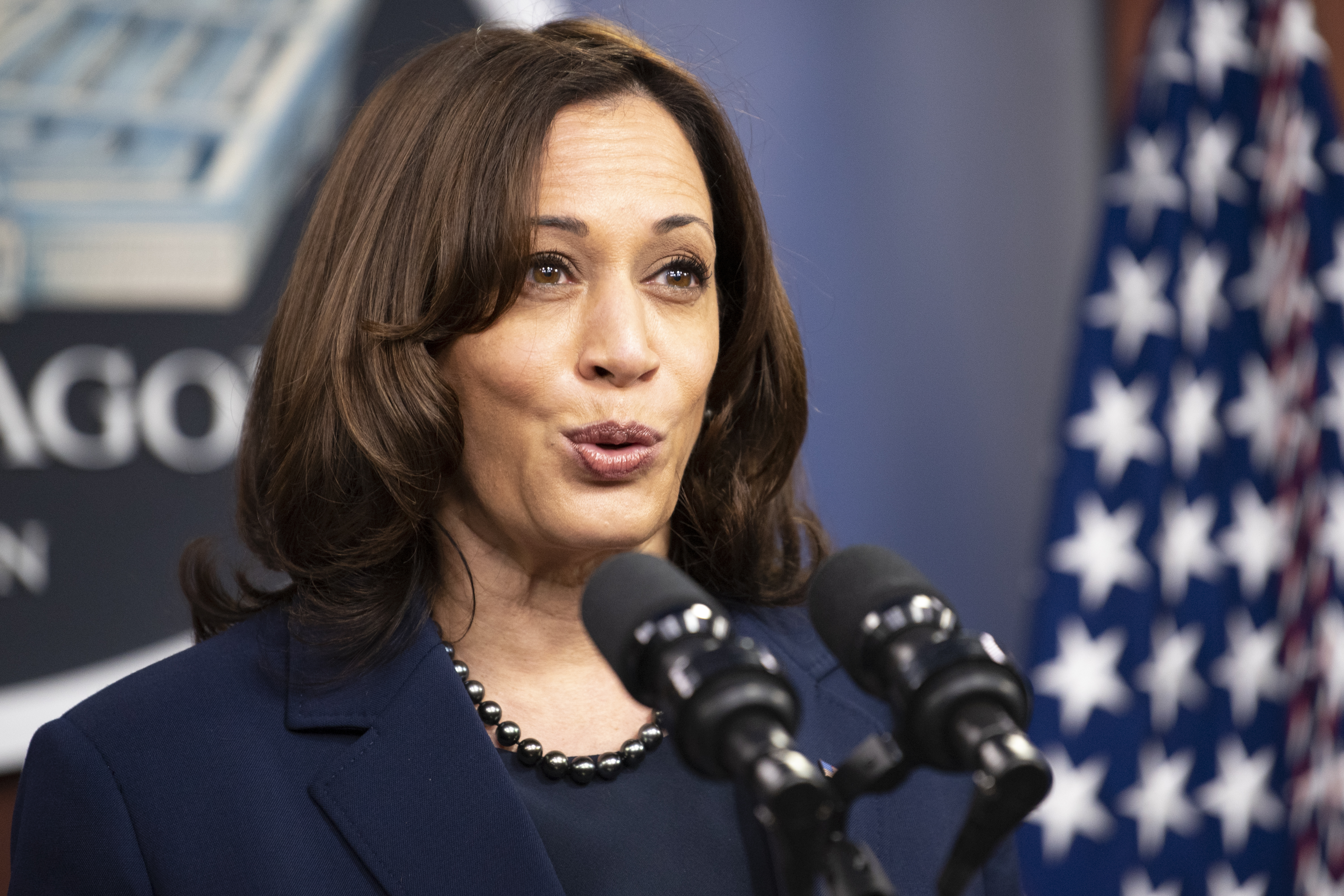
Harris speaks at The Pentagon in 2021.

=== Presidential war powers ===
In September 2019, The New York Times issued a questionnaire including the question, "Under what circumstances other than a literally imminent threat to the United States, if any, does the Constitution permit a president to order an attack on another country without prior Congressional authorization? What about bombing Iranian or North Korean nuclear facilities?" Harris answered: "The President's top priority is to keep America secure, and I won't hesitate to do what it takes to protect our country in the face of an imminent threat in the future. But after almost two decades of war, it is long past time for Congress to rewrite the Authorization for Use of Military Force that governs our current military conflicts. The situations in Iran or North Korea would require careful consideration of all of the surrounding facts and circumstances."

=== Asia ===
==== China ====
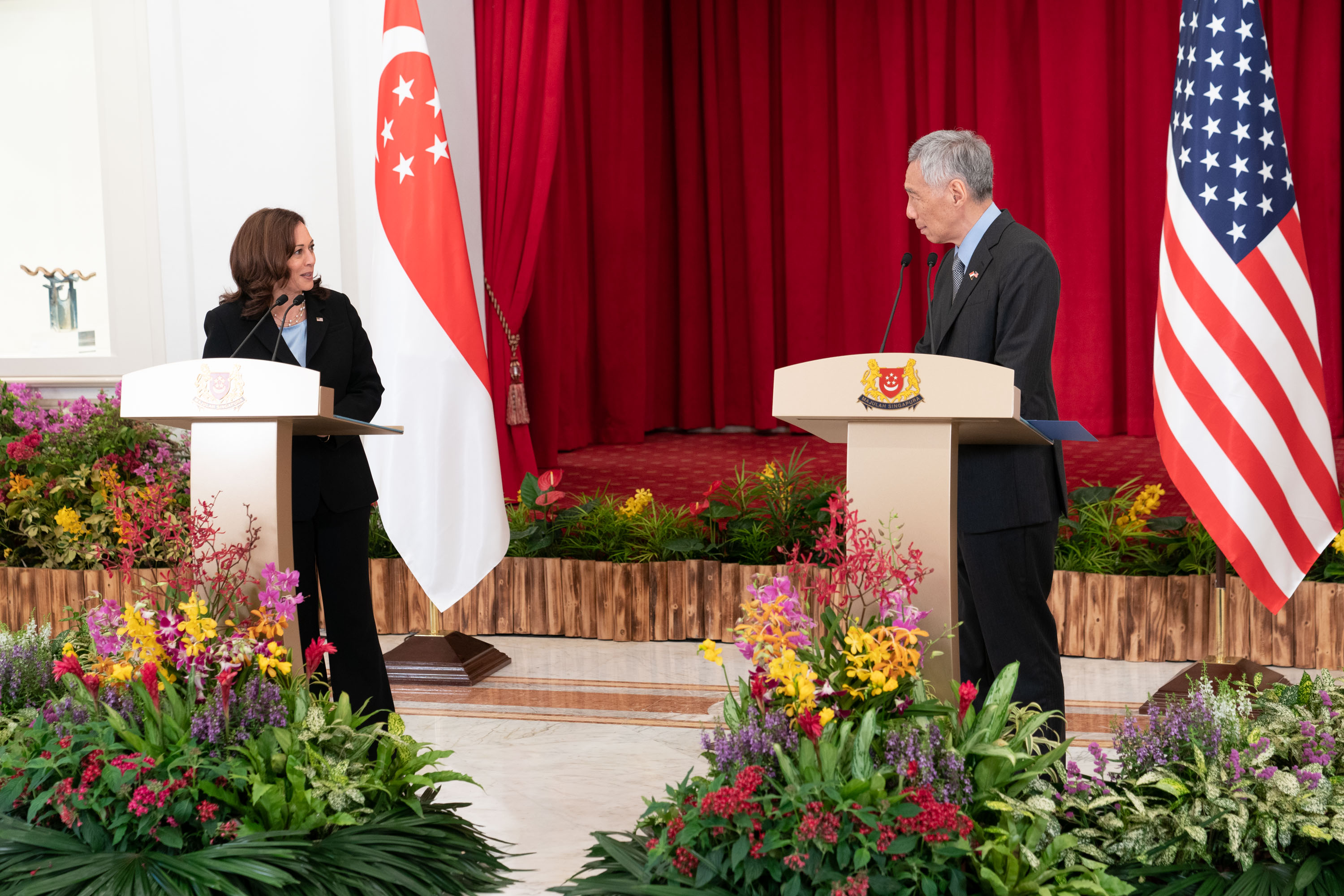
Harris meets with Prime Minister Lee Hsien Loong in Istana, Singapore, August 2021.

Harris sharply criticized President Trump's trade war with China, calling the administration's arbitrary use of tariffs "counterproductive to its goal of ensuring a level playing field for American companies."

Harris has also condemned the Chinese government's "abysmal human rights record", emphasizing the mass detention of Uyghur Muslims in the Xinjiang re-education camps and mass surveillance in China for political and religious repression. She added that while cooperation with the Chinese may be necessary on global issues like climate change, the U.S. must reclaim its moral authority to stand up forcefully for human rights in China. Harris has expressed her support for the protesters in Hong Kong, co-sponsoring the Hong Kong Human Rights and Democracy Act in October 2019, condemning the Hong Kong government's "excessive use of force" and "failure to respect the rights and autonomy of Hong Kong's people", and criticizing the Trump administration for turning "a blind eye."

In September 2023, as Harris attended the annual East Asia Summit in Jakarta, Indonesia, she rebuked China for its "bullying" attempts to control access to the South China Sea. After the trip, Harris told CBS host Margaret Brennan that the U.S. relationship with China is about both de-risking and understanding, adding, "It's not about pulling out, but it is about ensuring that we are protecting American interests, and that we are a leader in terms of the rules of the road, as opposed to following others' rules."

==== India ====
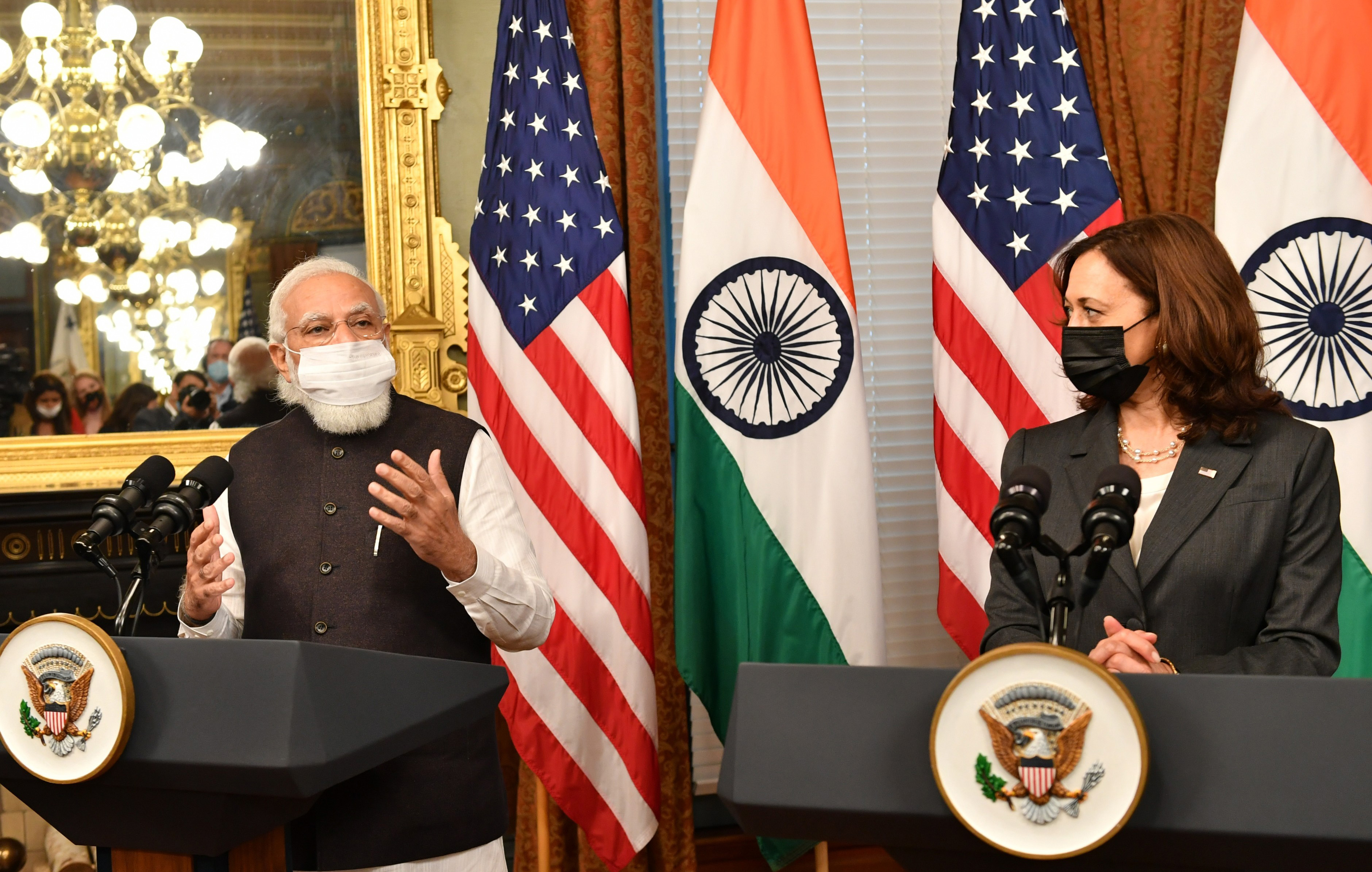
Harris with Indian prime minister Narendra Modi in Washington, D.C., September 2021

Harris has taken stances on Indian legislation such as the Citizenship Act, as well as legislation affecting Kashmir, which the Indian government considers sovereign matters. Within weeks after India ended Kashmir's special status on August 5, 2019, Harris and other leaders of the Democratic Party met members of the Kashmiri diaspora represented by the non-governmental organization Justice For Kashmir (JFK). According to media reports, JFK aims to raise awareness of India's "political incursions" in Kashmir among leading U.S. politicians, bureaucrats, and intellectuals. These meetings were arranged by Asif Mahmood, a Pakistani doctor who was at the time running for lieutenant governor of California.

In December 2019, Harris criticized India's foreign minister, Subrahmanyam Jaishankar, for refusing to attend a meeting with Congressional delegates because the delegation included Pramila Jayapal, who had introduced a resolution urging India to lift restrictions on Kashmir. The Narendra Modi administration said the resolution was not a "fair characteristic of what the government of India is doing".

During her presidential campaign, when Harris was asked about the lockdown in Kashmir, she said, "It is about reminding people that they are not alone, that we are all watching".

In June 2023, Harris and Secretary of State Antony Blinken hosted a luncheon with Prime Minister Modi, at which she thanked him for his "role and leadership in helping India emerge as a global leader in the 21st century". Modi in turn praised Harris for her achievements and called her an inspiration for women in both the U.S. and India.

==== Myanmar ====
In October 2017, Harris condemned the genocide of the Rohingya Muslim minority in Myanmar and called for a stronger response to the crisis.

==== North Korea ====
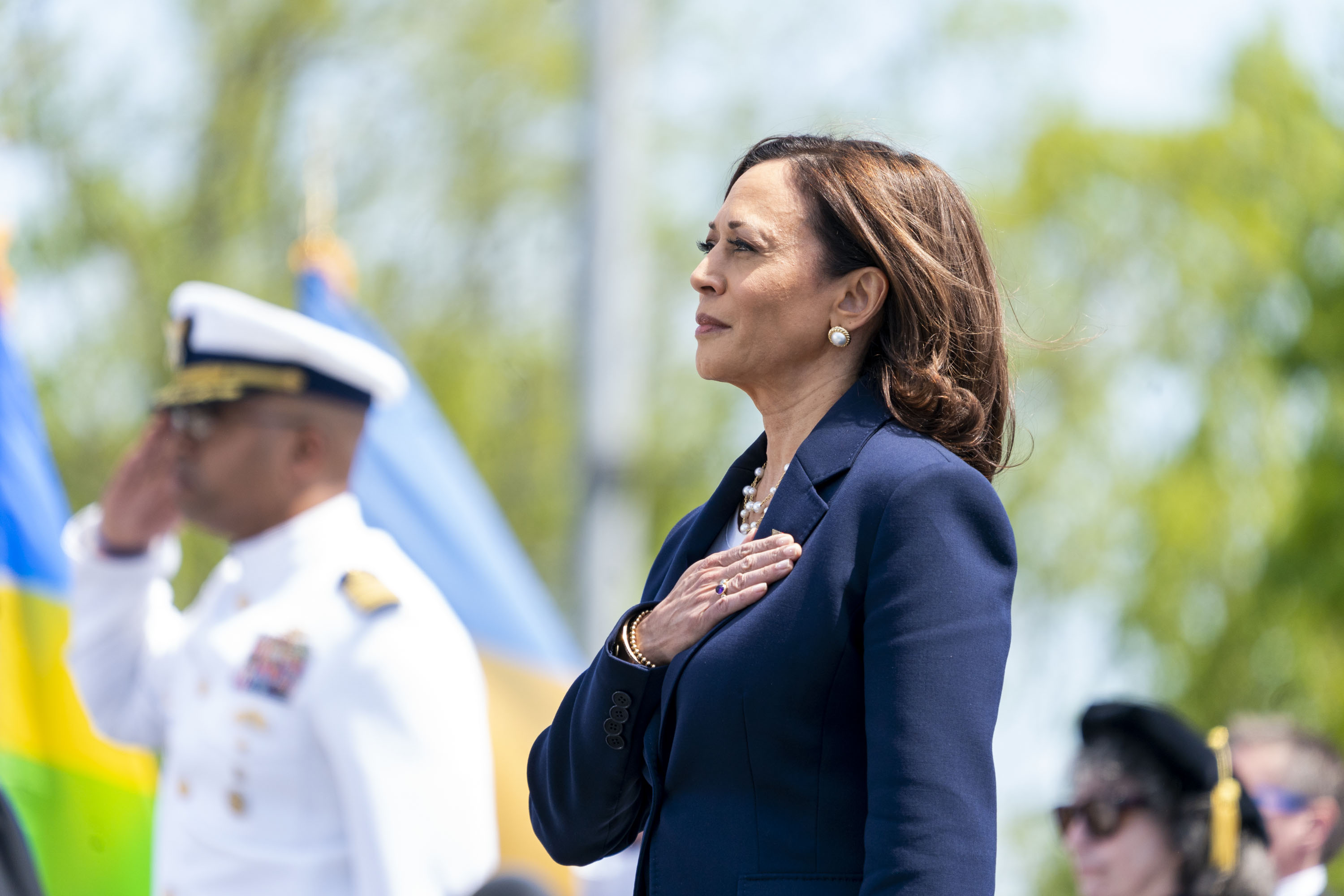
Harris at U.S. Coast Guard Academy, May 2022

Serving on the Select Committee on Intelligence, Harris called North Korea "one of the most serious security threats." In February 2018, she was one of 18 Democratic senators to sign a letter to President Trump saying that he lacked the authority to launch a preemptive strike against North Korea without authorization from Congress. The letter read:

Without congressional authority, a preventative or preemptive U.S. military strike would lack either a constitutional basis or legal authority.

In February 2019, after former acting FBI director Andrew McCabe said that Trump believed the claims of President of Russia Vladimir Putin over U.S. intelligence agencies' reports on the subject of North Korea's missile capabilities, she told reporters, "The idea that the president of the U.S. would take the word of the head of Russia over the intel community is the height of irresponsibility and shameful." Later that month, the 2019 North Korea–United States Hanoi Summit scheduled for February 27 and 28 at the Sofitel Legend Metropole Hanoi in Hanoi, Vietnam, was cut short without an agreement after the White House claimed North Korea purportedly requested an end to all sanctions, though North Korean foreign minister Ri Yong-ho later said the regime was interested only in a partial lifting of sanctions.

In a May 2019 appearance on CNN, Harris condemned Trump's relationship with North Korean dictator Kim Jong-un. After the failure of the Hanoi summit and after a North Korean ship was seized in defiance of international sanctions, Kim conducted missile tests in retaliation, and Harris said that embracing Kim and not confronting the regime's human rights violations was "not in the best interests of the nation".

In an August 2019 interview, Harris emphasized that any diplomatic solution with respect to North Korea must involve Japan and the Republic of Korea. When asked whether, as president, she would sign an agreement with North Korea granting partial sanctions relief in exchange for some denuclearization, Harris replied that Trump had given "Kim one PR victory after the next, all without securing any real concessions" and that she would "consider targeted sanctions relief to improve the lives of the North Korean people if the regime were to take serious, verifiable steps to roll back its nuclear program."

During the November 2019 Democratic presidential debate, Harris was asked whether she would make concessions to Kim to continue the talks the Trump administration started. Harris responded that Trump had been "punked" and had compromised the United States' ability to slow North Korea's nuclear program. She added that since military exercises with South Korea had ended, there were no more concessions to be made and that Trump had "traded a photo op for nothing".

=== Central and South America ===
==== El Salvador, Guatemala, and Honduras ====
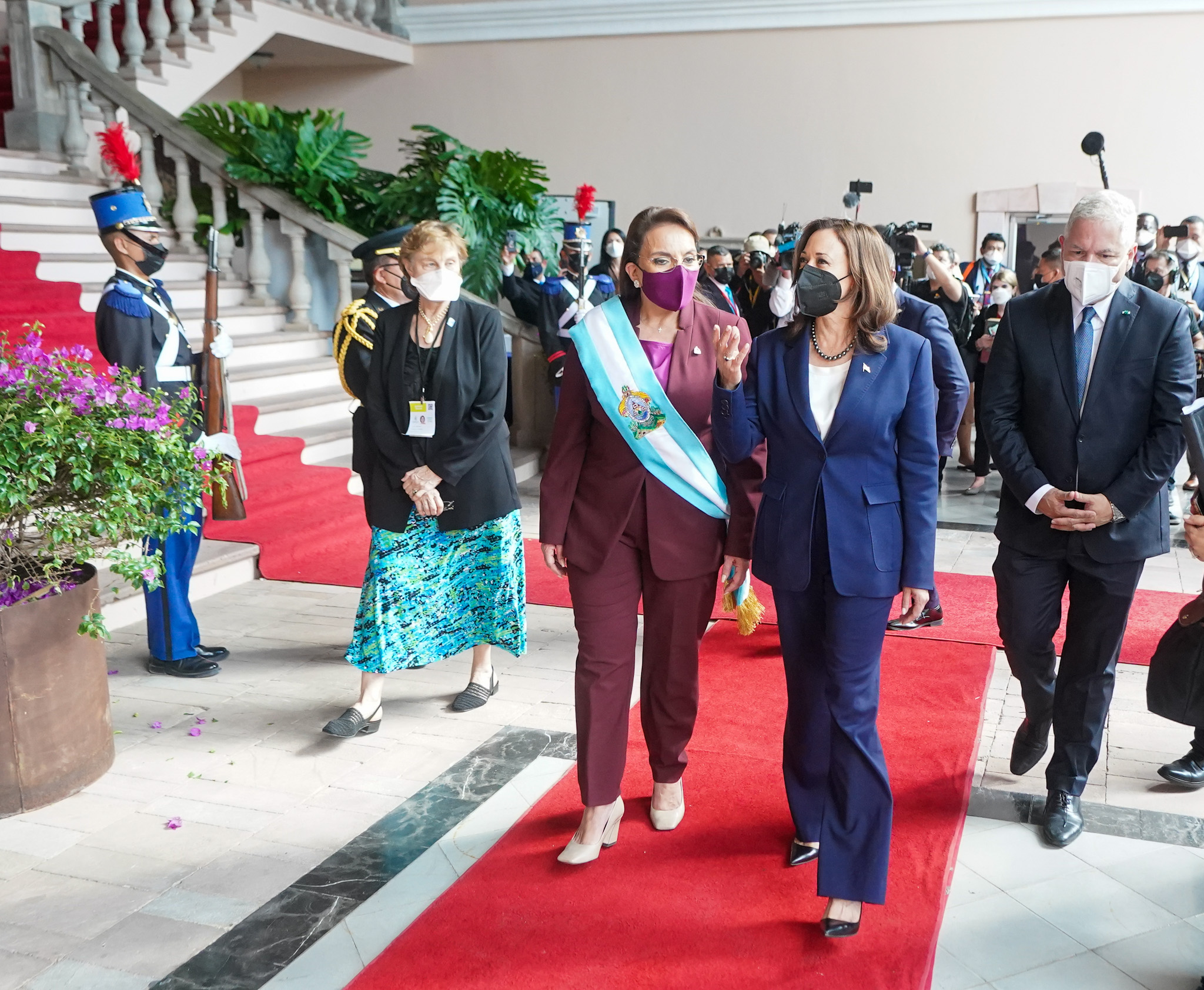
Harris attends the inauguration of Honduran President Xiomara Castro, January 2022.

In April and July 2019, Harris was one of 34 senators to sign a letter to Trump encouraging him "to listen to members of your own Administration" and reverse a decision to cut off $370 million in foreign assistance to the Northern Triangle Countries of Central America, El Salvador, Guatemala, and Honduras. The senators argued that foreign assistance to Central American countries created less migration to the U.S. by helping to improve conditions in those countries. The group wrote in the letter:

We encourage you to listen to members of your own Administration and reverse a decision that will damage our national security and aggravate conditions inside Central America.

She later led what is now called the Root Causes Strategy for addressing illegal immigration from these countries.

==== Brazil ====
In 2019, as the 2019 Amazon rainforest wildfires began intensifying in Brazil, Bolivia, Paraguay, and Peru as a result of slash-and-burn deforestation and the effects of climate change, Harris called out Brazilian president Jair Bolsonaro for his failure to act. She later joined her Senate colleagues in urging U.S. Trade Representative Robert Lighthizer to postpone trade negotiations with Brazil until he took steps to combat the deforestation.

==== Venezuela ====
In early 2019, the Venezuelan presidential crisis erupted between factions supporting incumbent Nicolás Maduro and challenger Juan Guaidó. The opposition-majority National Assembly declared Maduro a "usurper" and announced its intention to proceed with Guaidó as the acting president under Article 233 of the Venezuelan Constitution, while the Supreme Tribunal of Justice declared the National Assembly "unconstitutional." Protests erupted and international condemnation of Maduro followed, with about 60 countries recognizing Guaidó as acting president. Recognition of the Maduro government fell along traditional geopolitical lines, with the governments of China, Cuba, Iran, North Korea, Russia, and Turkey supporting him. Guaidó promised to allow U.S. oil companies to increase their activity in Venezuela. His U.S. supporters, such as Senator Marco Rubio, said that Guaidó would create jobs refining heavy crude for American workers.

In response, Harris condemned Maduro as a repressive and corrupt dictator, calling on the Venezuelan military not to exercise use of force against civilians. She committed to extending temporary protected status to Venezuelans living in the U.S. to prevent their deportation. She did not support military action by U.S. forces, criticizing John Bolton's suggestion to adopt a more hawkish position, instead advocating additional aid to humanitarian organizations working in Venezuela.

After the US launched a massive attack on Venezuela and the arrest and kidnapping of Venezuelan President Nicolas Maduro and his wife on January 3, 2026, She warned of the consequences of Washington's actions in Venezuela. Harris wrote in a message on the social network "X": This action could lead to chaos that American families will pay for. Trump's actions in Venezuela do not make America safer, stronger, or more cost-effective. She continued by emphasizing that the kidnapping of Venezuelan President Nicolas Maduro was illegal and irrational, and stated: Donald Trump's actions are for oil, not democracy or the fight against drugs. America needs a leader who prioritizes the interests of its people, not fruitless military adventures.

=== Europe ===
==== NATO ====
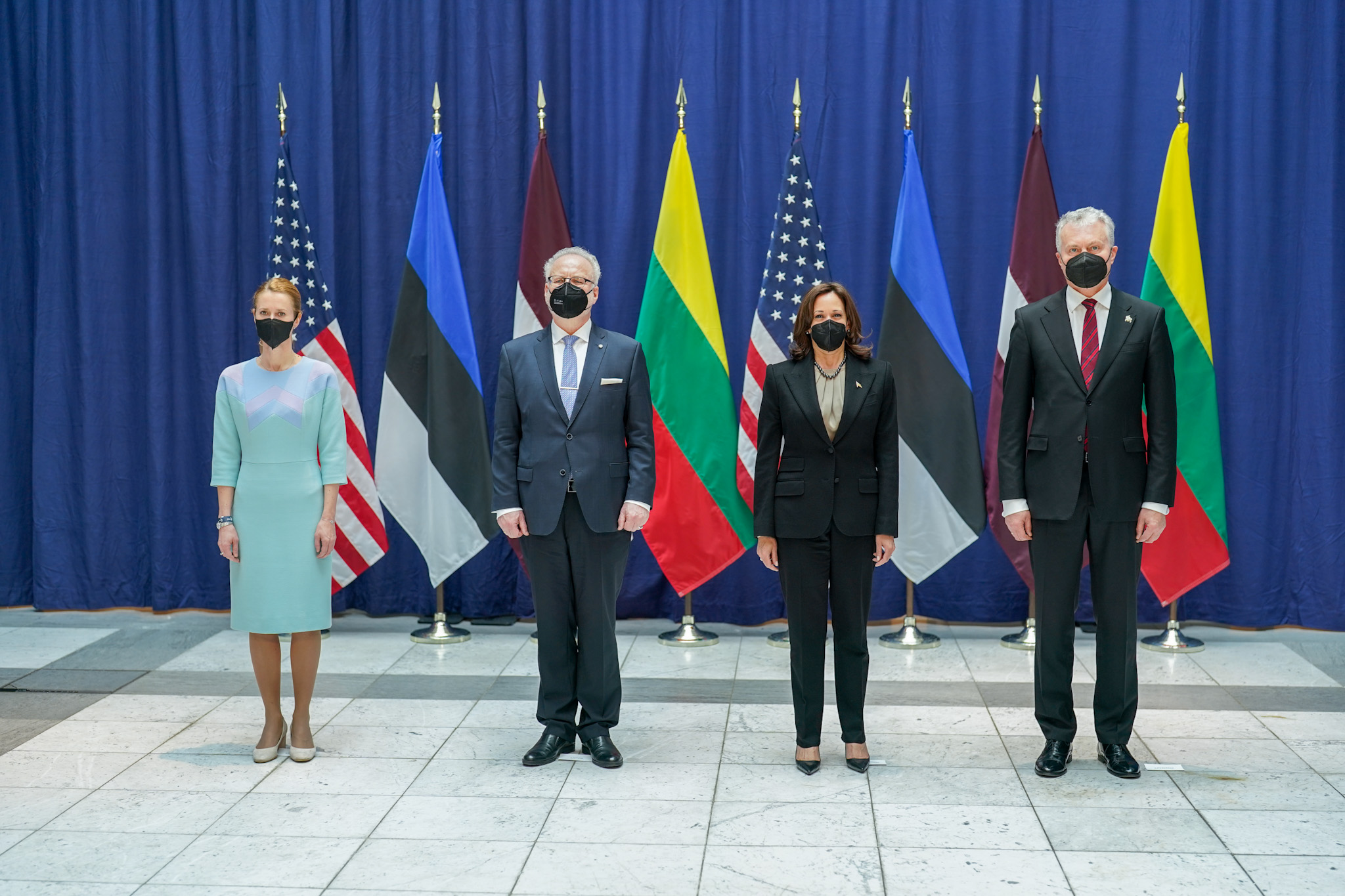
Harris represents the United States at Munich Security Conference standing with NATO allies, February 2022.

In July 2018, ahead of Exercise RIMPAC, the world's largest international maritime warfare exercise between the military forces from the Pacific Rim and beyond, Harris expressed gratitude to the member nations of NATO. She said that Trump's "disgusting" criticism of Canada, Germany, and other NATO countries had "frayed" the alliance but that "longtime mutual trust surpasses whatever happens in the White House".

==== Russia ====
In June 2017, Harris spoke out against Russia's interference in the 2016 elections, calling out its exploitation of divisive issues and joining the intelligence community's unanimous assessment that the Russians assisted Trump's campaign. In July 2017, she voted for the Countering America's Adversaries Through Sanctions Act, which grouped together sanctions against Iran, Russia and North Korea.

Harris has condemned the Annexation of Crimea by the Russian Federation, calling it a "severe violation of the international norms that have guided the world since World War II." She also called the downing of Malaysia Airlines Flight 17 an act of Russian aggression, attributing responsibility for the deaths of the 298 civilian passengers to a Russian surface-to-air missile. She expressed her support for the sovereignty of Ukraine. She led her colleagues in holding the Trump administration accountable on the issue by filing a Freedom of Information Act lawsuit, hoping to release documents related to the Trump–Ukraine scandal that eventually led to Trump's first impeachment.

In December 2018, after Secretary of State Mike Pompeo announced the Trump administration would suspend its obligations in the Intermediate-Range Nuclear Forces Treaty in 60 days if Russia continued to violate the treaty, Harris was one of 26 senators to sign a letter expressing concern about "abandoning generations of bipartisan U.S. leadership around the paired goals of reducing the global role and number of nuclear weapons and ensuring strategic stability with America's nuclear-armed adversaries" and calling on Trump to continue arms negotiations.

In April 2024, Harris wrote a column for Time magazine's list of 100 most influential people describing her meeting with Yulia Navalnaya at the Munich Security Conference in February, the day Yulia's husband Alexei Navalny, Russian opposition leader, died in a penal colony in Russia's Far North.

==== Ukraine ====
In February 2023, Harris said that the U.S. had determined that Russia had committed "crimes against humanity" in its invasion of Ukraine and that the perpetrators and those complicit in their crimes would be held accountable.

In February 2024, Harris and President of Ukraine Volodymyr Zelenskyy held a news conference at the Munich Security Conference. Harris said: "President Biden and I will continue to work to secure the resources and weapons you need to succeed. We will be with you for as long as it takes."

=== Middle East ===
==== Afghanistan ====
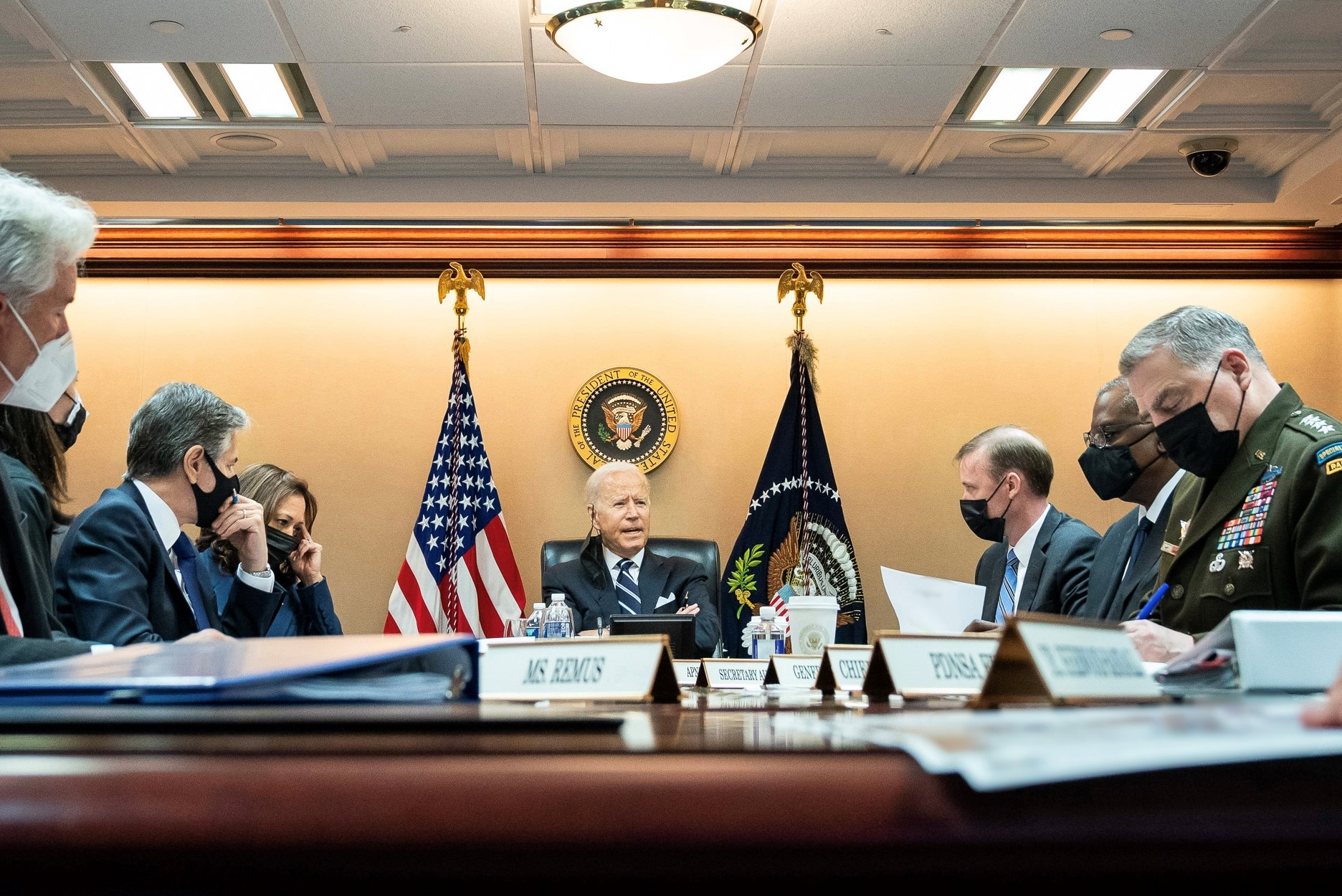
US president Joe Biden and Kamala Harris discussing the fall of Kabul with the National Security Council, August 2021

In December 2018, Harris traveled to Kabul, Mazar-e Sharif, and Kandahar in Afghanistan with two of her Republican colleagues on the Senate Intelligence Committee, Richard Burr and James Lankford, to visit troops, diplomats, and other national security professionals. Harris said the War in Afghanistan must end, albeit responsibly and in coordination with regional allies to protect gains made for Afghan women and others.

Harris was the last person in the room when Biden made the decision to withdraw troops from Afghanistan. In the days after the U.S. completed the withdrawal, Harris made a rare appearance in the Senate chamber as the Senate passed a bill furthering repatriation funding to aid over 5,000 Americans who evacuated from Afghanistan after the Taliban took control of the country.

==== Israel ====
In 2017, Harris gave a public address to AIPAC attendees. She said: "I believe Israel should never be a partisan issue, and as long as I'm a United States senator, I will do everything in my power to ensure broad and bipartisan support for Israel's security and right to self-defense." She noted that "the first resolution I co-sponsored as a United States senator was to combat anti-Israel bias at the United Nations", referring to a Senate resolution celebrating the 50th anniversary of Jerusalem's reunification. Also in that speech, she expressed her support for a two-state solution to the Israeli–Palestinian conflict.

In late 2017, Harris traveled to Israel, met with Israeli prime minister Benjamin Netanyahu, and visited the Western Wall, Yad Vashem, and the Supreme Court of Israel. Executive Director of the Jewish Democratic Council of America Halie Soifer, who previously served as Harris's national security advisor, said:

She has been a lifelong supporter of Israel. She has talked about the importance of ensuring that the US-Israel relationship remains strong, and not be politicized in the way that this administration has done to divide Democrats. I think she's very supportive of the US-Israel relationship.

In 2018, in another speech to AIPAC, Harris reiterated her support for Israel, reminiscing about growing up in the Bay Area, collecting funds to plant trees in Israel for the Jewish National Fund. She later condemned antisemitism in the aftermath of Tree of Life – Or L'Simcha Congregation shooting, in which 11 worshippers died.

In 2019, Harris opposed the Boycott, Divestment, and Sanctions movement targeting Israel. She co-sponsored a Senate resolution expressing objection to the UN Security Council Resolution 2334, which condemned Israeli settlement building in the West Bank as a violation of international law.

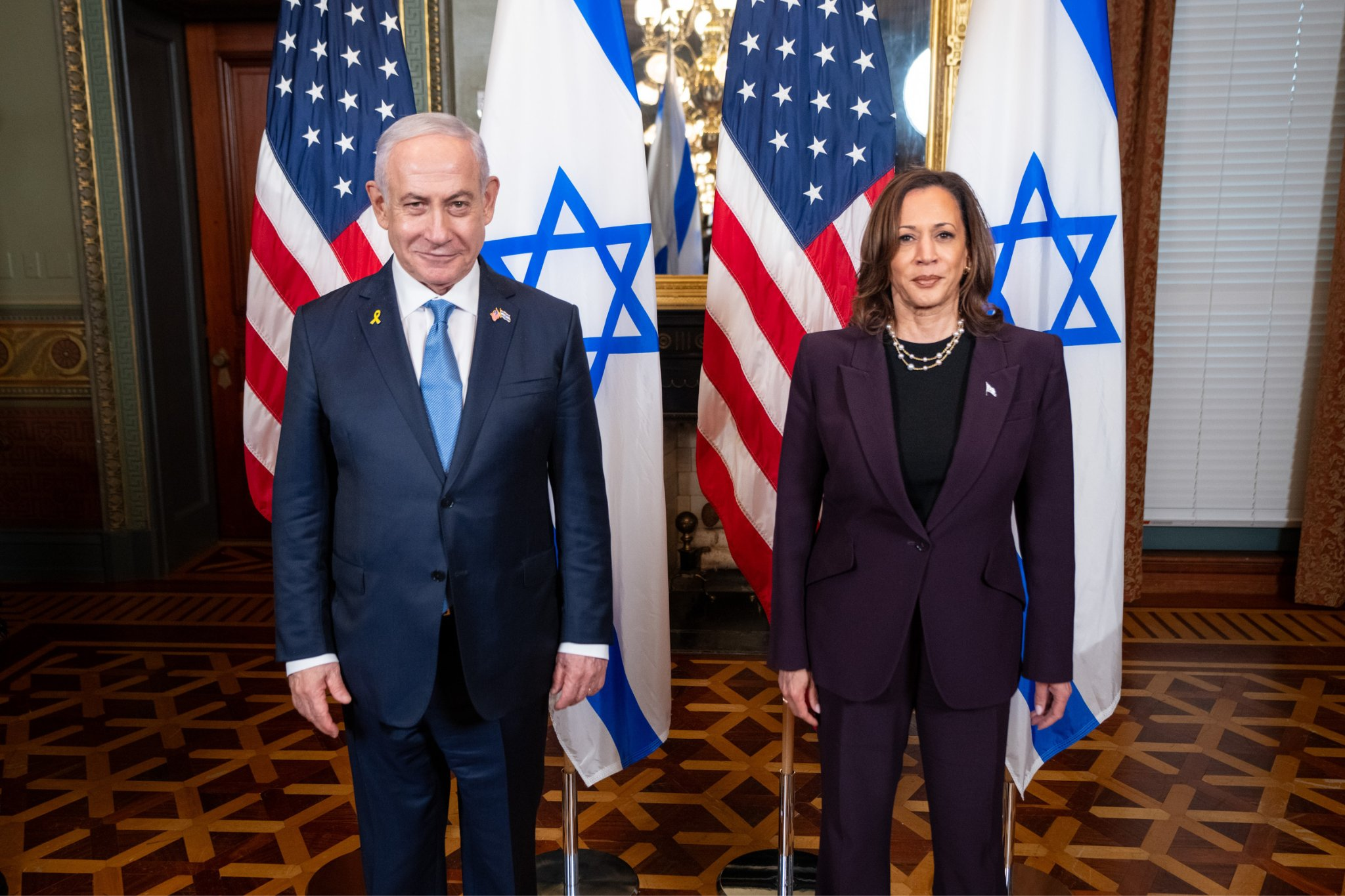
Kamala Harris meeting Israeli Prime Minister Benjamin Netanyahu in 2024

In March 2024, in remarks at the Edmund Pettus Bridge in Selma, Alabama, Harris called for a ceasefire in the Gaza war and urged Hamas to accept a deal to release hostages in return for violence ending for six weeks: "People in Gaza are starving. The conditions are inhumane and our common humanity compels us to act. The Israeli government must do more to significantly increase the flow of aid. No excuses."

In August 2024, national security advisor Philip H. Gordon said that Harris did not support an arms embargo on Israel or placing conditions for military aid to Israel.

On August 10, 2024, when asked about the Al-Tabaeen school attack in Gaza, Harris said Israel had a right to "go after Hamas" but should "avoid civilian casualties", adding, "First and foremost—and the president and I have been working on this around the clock—we need to get the hostages out."

On September 28, 2024, in response to the Israeli airstrike that killed Hassan Nasrallah, Harris said the killing provided "a measure of justice" to Hezbollah's victims. She reiterated her commitment to Israel's security and her opposition to a broadening of the conflict. At the 2024 Democratic National Convention she stated "Let me be clear, I will always stand up for Israel's right to defend itself".

==== Iran ====
Harris supported the Joint Comprehensive Plan of Action, also known as the Iran nuclear deal. In 2018, after Trump announced the U.S. was withdrawing from the treaty, Harris released a statement saying the decision "jeopardizes our national security and isolates us from our closest allies" while calling the Joint Comprehensive Plan of Action "the best existing tool we have to prevent Iran from developing nuclear weapons and avoid a disastrous military conflict in the Middle East." In 2019, Harris said she would rejoin the agreement and expand it to cover ballistic missile testing.

In the wake of the assassination of Qasem Soleimani, the commander of the Iranian Quds Force, Harris joined her Senate colleagues in introducing the No War Against Iran Act and condemning Trump's "dangerous escalation" with the Iranian regime.

==== Saudi Arabia ====
In late 2018, Harris voted to withdraw U.S. military aid for Saudi Arabia's war in Yemen. She also backed a resolution blaming Saudi crown prince Mohammad bin Salman for the murder of dissident journalist Jamal Khashoggi at the Saudi Arabian consulate in Istanbul and said that Trump had turned a blind eye to the murder. She has called for a "fundamental" reevaluation of the U.S. relationship with Saudi Arabia, but acknowledged that the Saudis have been strong partners in areas of mutual interest, such as counterterrorism.

==== Syria ====
In April 2017, in response to the Khan Shaykhun chemical attack, Harris condemned Syrian president Bashar al-Assad for attacking Syrian children, calling it a "clear fact that president Assad is not only a ruthless dictator brutalizing his own people—he is a war criminal the international community cannot ignore." She called on Trump to work with Congress on his administration's "lack of clear objectives in Syria and articulate a detailed strategy and path forward in partnership with our allies." Later that month, in her first overseas trip as a senator, she visited the Zaatari refugee camp in Jordan, the world's largest camp for Syrian refugees.

In May 2017, the Trump administration armed Kurds in Syria in the fight against ISIS over the objections of Turkey. In November 2017, under pressure from Turkish president Recep Tayyip Erdogan, Trump reversed course and cut off the Kurds' supply of arms. Then, in December 2018, Trump announced the full withdrawal of U.S. troops from Syria, leading to the resignation of Defense Secretary Jim Mattis. Harris immediately criticized Trump's decision, which gave Turkey the green light to launch the military offensive against Syrian Kurds.

In August 2019, after Representative Tulsi Gabbard attacked Harris's record as a prosecutor in a presidential debate, Harris called Gabbard an "apologist" for Assad's regime. In a November 2019 a presidential debate, Harris condemned Gabbard for meeting with Assad in 2017, her subsequent skepticism about claims that Assad used chemical weapons against civilians in Khan Shaykhun, and her refusal to call Assad a war criminal.

== Climate change and the environment ==
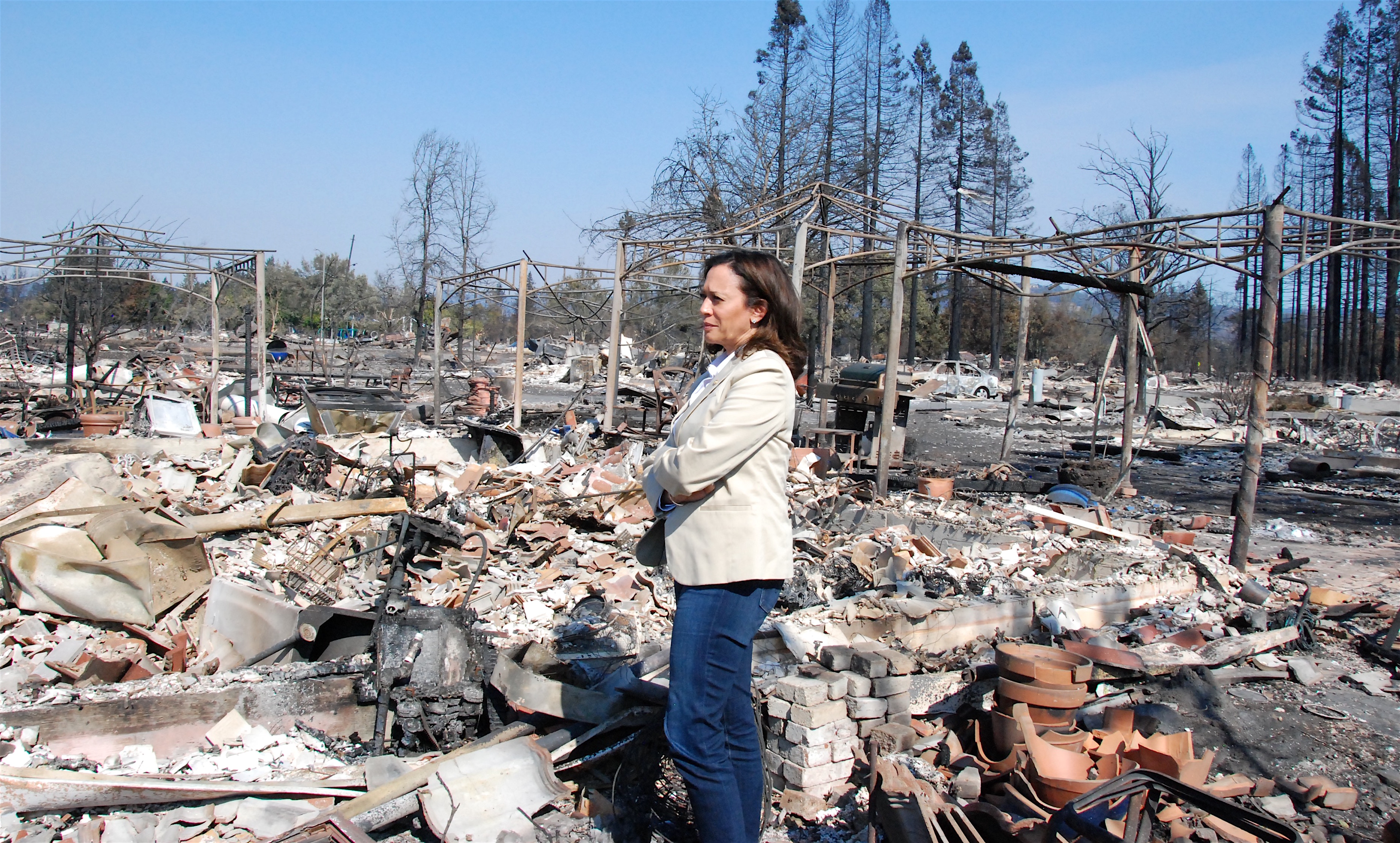
U.S. Senator Harris tours neighborhood in Santa Rosa, California.

During her time as San Francisco District Attorney, Harris created the Environmental Justice Unit in the San Francisco District Attorney's Office and prosecuted several industries and individuals for pollution, most notably U-Haul, Alameda Publishing Corporation, and the Cosco Busan oil spill. She also advocated strong enforcement of environmental protection laws.

In October 2017, Harris was one of 19 senators to sign a letter to Administrator of the Environmental Protection Agency Scott Pruitt questioning Pruitt's decision to repeal the Clean Power Plan, asserting that the repeal's proposal used "mathematical sleights of hand to overstate the costs of industry compliance with the 2015 Rule and understate the benefits that will be lost if the 2017 repeal is finalized" and that denying science and fabricating math would fail to "satisfy the requirements of the law, nor will it slow the increase in frequency and intensity of extreme weather events, the inexorable rise in sea levels, or the other dire effects of global warming that our planet is already experiencing."

In September 2018, Harris was one of eight senators to sponsor the Climate Risk Disclosure Act, a bill co-sponsor Elizabeth Warren said would use "market forces to speed up the transition from fossil fuels to cleaner energy—reducing the odds of an environmental and financial disaster without spending a dime of taxpayer money." Harris said her goal would be to get 100% of U.S. electricity from renewable energy sources, and that she supports a Green New Deal, an idea popularized by Representative Alexandria Ocasio-Cortez, because "climate change is an existential threat to all of us".

In November 2018, Harris was one of 25 Democratic senators to co-sponsor a resolution specifying key findings of the Intergovernmental Panel on Climate Change report and National Climate Assessment. The resolution affirmed the senators' acceptance of the findings and their support for bold action to address climate change.

On July 29, 2019, Harris and Ocasio-Cortez introduced the Climate Equity Act, a bill that laid out steps for Congress and the White House to guarantee policies that composed "a future Green New Deal to protect the health and economic wellbeing of all Americans for generations to come." Calling climate change "an existential threat", Harris said that cutting emissions and ending American reliance on fossil fuels were not enough and cited the need "that communities already contending with unsafe drinking water, toxic air, and lack of economic opportunity are not left behind."

In August 2019, Harris was one of 15 senators to sign a letter to EPA Administrator Andrew Wheeler urging the EPA to ban chlorpyrifos given that the agency had found "that chlorpyrifos harms children's brains at exposures far lower than what the EPA allows" and warned that "more children, farmworkers and American families will be exposed to this pesticide and they will suffer as a result" of the EPA not reversing its decision.

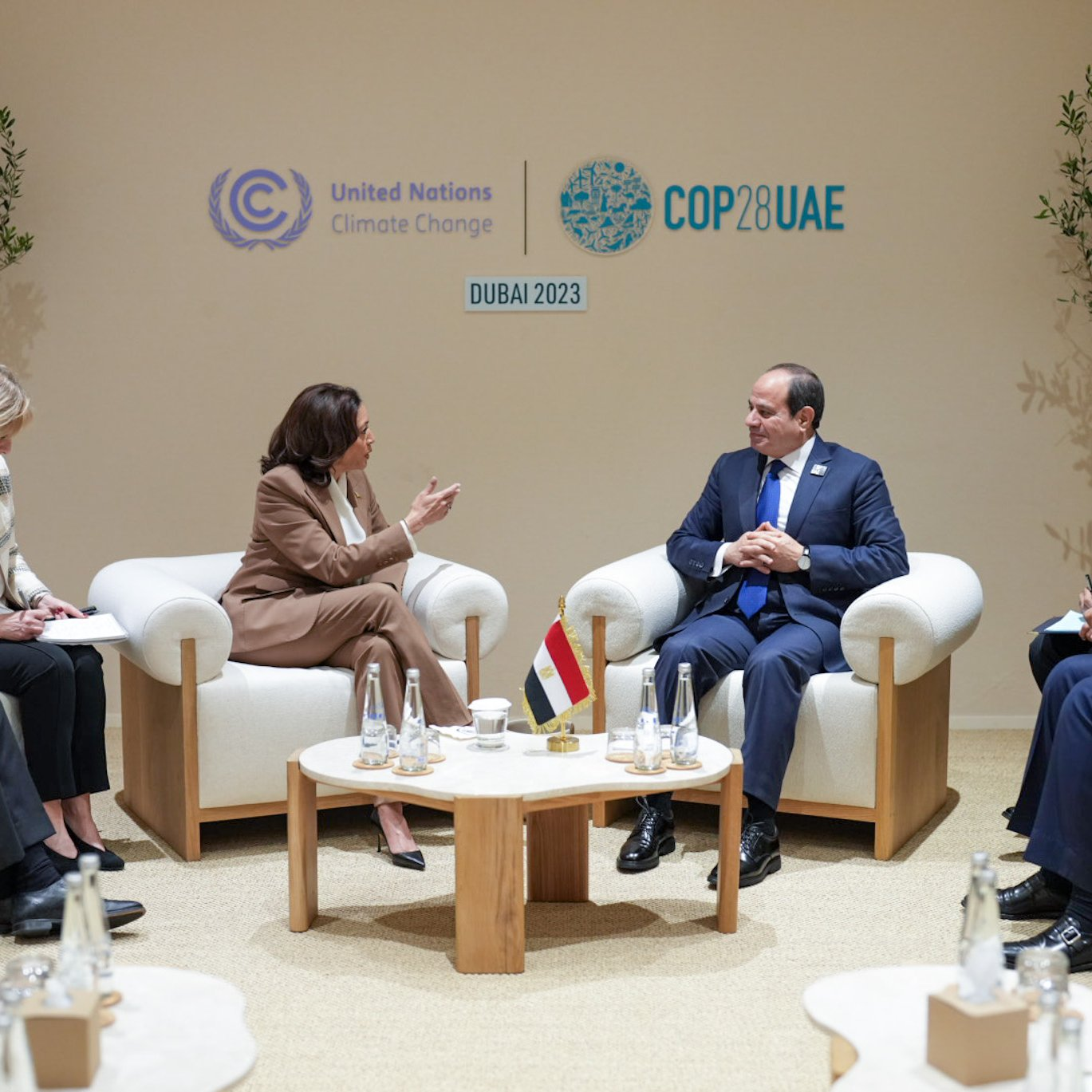
Harris and Egyptian president Abdel Fattah el-Sisi, holding a bilateral meeting at the COP28 climate summit in Dubai in December 2023.

On September 4, 2019, Harris unveiled a $10 trillion climate change plan intended to move the U.S. to a 100% renewable energy-based power grid by 2030 in addition to requiring that all vehicles sold in the U.S. have no tailpipe emissions by 2035. She pledged to rejoin the Paris Agreement and end U.S. support for international oil and natural gas extraction projects, adding that as president she would "hold polluters accountable for the damage they inflict upon our environment and set us on a path to a 100% clean economy that creates millions of good-paying jobs".

In February 2020 Harris was one of seven senators to sign a letter to Secretary of the Interior David Bernhardt that called it "reckless and unwise" to remove protections to the Arctic after the U.S. Geological Survey found the Arctic to the fastest-warming place on earth and stating their support for "the strongest possible protections" for Special Areas within the National Petroleum Reserve-Alaska.

In April 2020, in response to the proposed decision of the EPA to retain the Obama administration's air quality standards, Harris was one of 18 senators to sign a letter led by Maggie Hassan asserting that the EPA "should be taking actions that will further protect health during this crisis, not put more Americans at risk".

In 2019, Harris said she supported a ban on fracking. In an August 2024 interview, she said she would not ban fracking as president.

== Lifetime ratings ==
Kamala Harris's lifetime ratings
Date	Organization	Advocacy	Lifetime rating
2019	Alliance for Retired Americans	Retirees	100%
2017–19	American Civil Liberties Union	Civil liberties	93%
2017–19	American Farm Bureau Federation	Agriculture	0%
2017–19	AFL-CIO	Trade unions	100%
2017	AFSCME	Public-sector trade unions	86%
2018	Center for Biological Diversity	Endangered species	89%
2019–20	Children's Defense Fund	Children's advocacy	100%
2017	Club for Growth	Tax reduction	4%
2019–20	Common Cause	Good government	100%
2017–18	FreedomWorks (defunct)	Government operations	29%
2017–18	Human Rights Campaign	LGBTQ rights	100%
2019	League of Conservation Voters	Environmentalism	91%
2017–18	National Association for the Advancement of Colored People	Civil rights	100%
2019–20	National Association of Police Organizations	Law enforcement	80%
2010–19	NARAL	Abortion rights	100%
2019	National Education Association	Education	100%
2010–16	NRA Political Victory Fund	Gun rights	7%
2020	NumbersUSA	Immigration reduction	0%
2017–19	Planned Parenthood	Abortion rights	100%
2020	United States Chamber of Commerce	Business	52%
