= US Senate career of Kamala Harris =

Career of Kamala Harris in the United States Senate

Kamala Harris
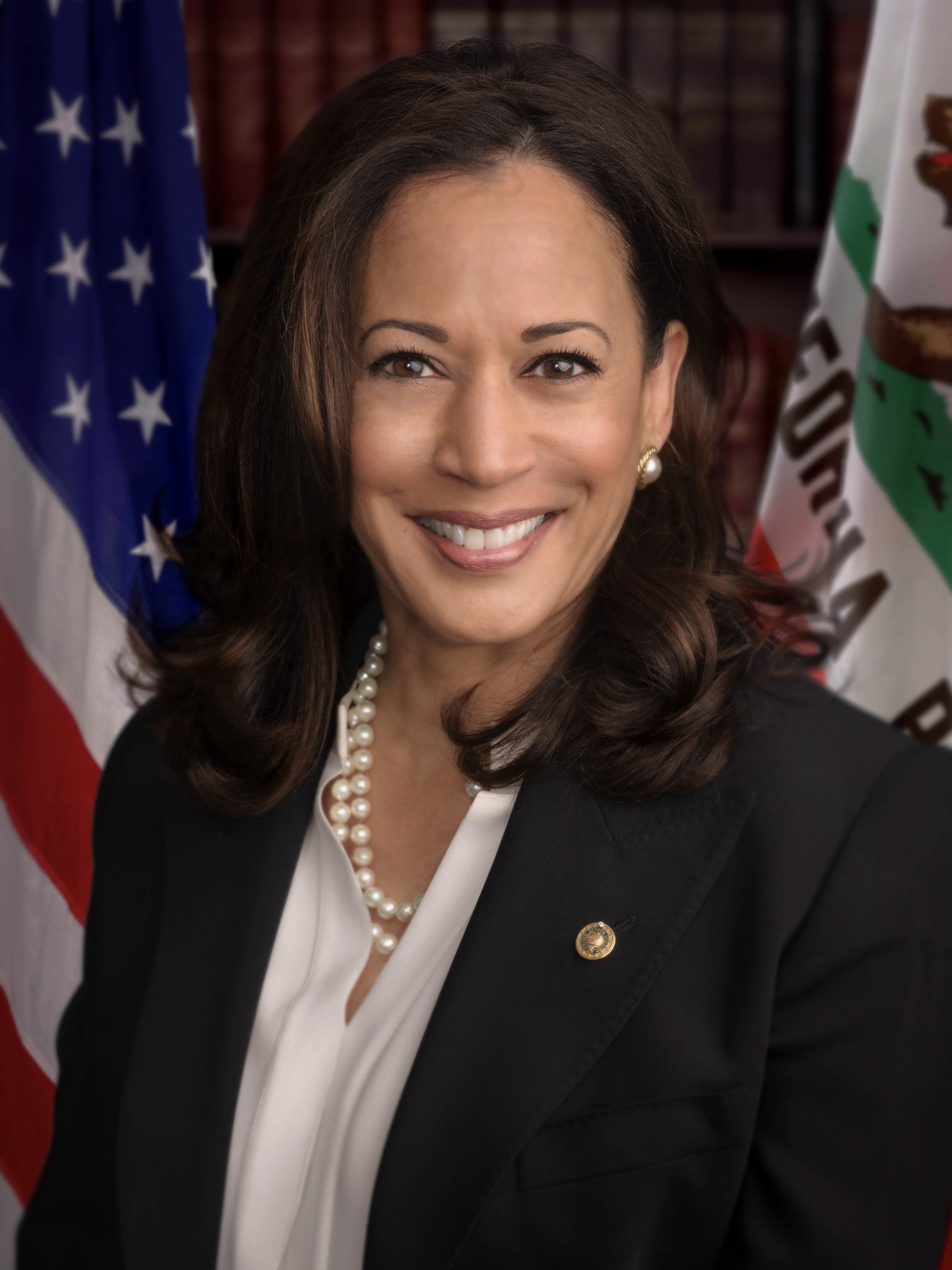
- Official portrait, 2017

President of the United States Senate
- In office January 20, 2021 – January 20, 2025
- President pro tem: Patrick Leahy; Patty Murray; Chuck Grassley
- Preceded by: Mike Pence
- Succeeded by: JD Vance

United States Senator from California
- In office January 3, 2017 – January 18, 2021; Serving alongside Dianne Feinstein
- Preceded by: Barbara Boxer
- Succeeded by: Alex Padilla

The US Senate career of Kamala Harris began on January 3, 2017, and ended with her resignation on January 18, 2021, to become Vice President of the United States under President Joe Biden. A member of the Democratic Party, Harris defeated another Democrat in the 2016 election to serve as the junior U.S. senator representing California, alongside Dianne Feinstein.

Harris was the first South Asian American U.S. senator and the second Black woman after Carol Moseley Braun. She was first the Black and South Asian American to represent California in the Senate, the second Asian American after S. I. Hayakawa, and the third woman after Feinstein and Barbara Boxer, Harris' predecessor. As a senator, Harris advocated for stricter gun control laws, the DREAM Act, federal legalization of cannabis, Medicare for All, and reforms to taxation. She gained a national profile while asking pointed questions of officials in the first administration of Republican president Donald Trump during Senate hearings, including Trump's second U.S. Supreme Court nominee, Brett Kavanaugh. In 2019, GovTrack designated Harris as the "leftmost Democratic senator".

Harris sought the 2020 Democratic presidential nomination in 2019, but withdrew from the race before the primaries. Biden selected her as his running mate; their ticket defeated the incumbent president and vice president, Trump and Mike Pence, in the 2020 presidential election. During Harris' vice presidency, she cast more tie-breaking votes than any other vice president under the office's role as President of the United States Senate. Her votes passed the American Rescue Plan Act of 2021 and Inflation Reduction Act of 2022.

== 2016 election to the US Senate ==
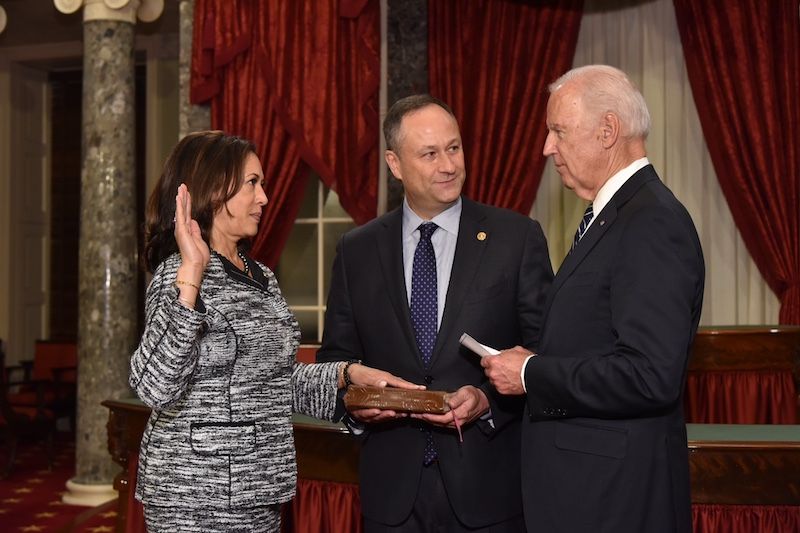
Harris being sworn into the Senate by then vice president Joe Biden in January 2017. At center is Harris's husband, Doug Emhoff.

After more than 20 years as a U.S. senator from California, Senator Barbara Boxer announced on January 13, 2015 that she would not run for reelection in 2016. Harris announced her candidacy for the Senate seat the next week. She was a top contender from the beginning of her campaign.

The 2016 California Senate election used California's new top-two primary format, where the top two candidates in the primary advance to the general election regardless of party. On February 27, 2016, Harris won 78% of the California Democratic Party vote at the party convention, allowing her campaign to receive financial support from the party. Three months later, Governor Jerry Brown endorsed her. In the June 7 primary, Harris came in first with 40% of the vote and won with pluralities in most counties. Harris faced representative and fellow Democrat Loretta Sanchez in the general election.

On July 19, President Barack Obama and Vice President Joe Biden endorsed Harris. In the November 2016 election, Harris defeated Sanchez with over 60% of the vote, carrying all but four counties. After her victory, she promised to protect immigrants from the policies of president-elect Donald Trump and announced her intention to remain attorney general through the end of 2016. Harris became the second Black woman and first South Asian American senator in history.

=== Election results ===
Results of the 2016 U.S. senatorial primary election in California held on June 7: Harris—>70% Harris—60–70% Harris—50–60% Harris—40–50% Harris—30–40% Harris—20–30% Harris—10–20% Sanchez—10–20% Sanchez—20–30% Sanchez—30–40%

2016 United States Senate primary election in California
Party	Candidate	Votes	%
Democratic	Kamala Harris	3,000,689	39.9%
Democratic	Loretta Sanchez	1,416,203	18.9%
Republican	Duf Sundheim	584,251	7.8%
Republican	Phil Wyman	352,821	4.7%
Republican	Tom Del Beccaro	323,614	4.3%
Republican	Greg Conlon	230,944	3.1%
Democratic	Steve Stokes	168,805	2.2%
Republican	George C. Yang	112,055	1.5%
Republican	Karen Roseberry	110,557	1.5%
Libertarian	Gail K. Lightfoot	99,761	1.3%
Democratic	Massie Munroe	98,150	1.3%
Green	Pamela Elizondo	95,677	1.3%
Republican	Tom Palzer	93,263	1.2%
Republican	Ron Unz	92,325	1.2%
Republican	Don Krampe	69,635	0.9%
No party preference	Eleanor García	65,084	0.9%
Republican	Jarrell Williamson	64,120	0.9%
Republican	Von Hougo	63,609	0.8%
Democratic	President Cristina Grappo	63,330	0.8%
No party preference	Jerry J. Laws	53,023	0.7%
Libertarian	Mark Matthew Herd	41,344	0.6%
Peace and Freedom	John Thompson Parker	35,998	0.5%
No party preference	Ling Ling Shi	35,196	0.5%
Democratic	Herbert G. Peters	32,638	0.4%
Democratic	Emory Peretz Rodgers	31,485	0.4%
No party preference	Mike Beitiks	31,450	0.4%
No party preference	Clive Grey	29,418	0.4%
No party preference	Jason Hanania	27,715	0.4%
No party preference	Paul Merritt	24,031	0.3%
No party preference	Jason Kraus	19,318	0.3%
No party preference	Don J. Grundmann	15,317	0.2%
No party preference	Scott A. Vineberg	11,843	0.2%
No party preference	Tim Gildersleeve	9,798	0.1%
No party preference	Gar Myers	8,726	0.1%
Republican	Billy Falling (write-in)	87	0.0%
No party preference	Ric M. Llewellyn (write-in)	32	0.0%
Republican	Alexis Stuart (write-in)	10	0.0%
Total votes		7,512,322	100.0%

2016 United States Senate election in California
Party	Candidate	Votes	%
Democratic	Kamala Harris	7,542,753	61.6%
Democratic	Loretta Sanchez	4,701,417	38.4%
Total votes		12,244,170	100.0%
Democratic hold			

== Tenure and political positions ==
As a senator, Harris advocated stricter gun control laws, the DREAM Act, federal legalization of cannabis, and healthcare and taxation reforms. She became well known nationally after questioning several Trump appointees such as Jeff Sessions and Brett Kavanaugh.

=== 2017 ===
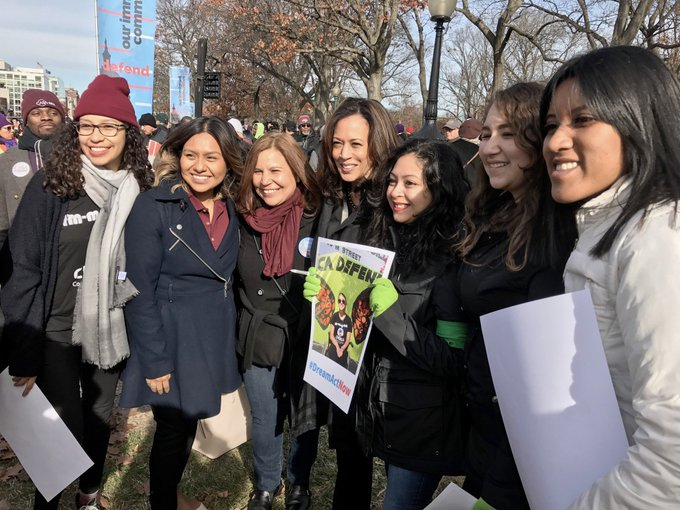
Harris with DREAMers, December 2017

On January 28, after Trump signed Executive Order 13769, barring citizens from several Muslim-majority countries from entering the U.S. for 90 days, she condemned the order and was one of many to call it a "Muslim ban". She called White House Chief of Staff John F. Kelly at home to gather information and push back against the executive order.

In February, Harris spoke in opposition to Trump's cabinet picks Betsy DeVos for secretary of education and Jeff Sessions for United States attorney general. In early March, she called on Sessions to resign, after it was reported that Sessions, who had previously said he "did not have communications with the Russians", spoke twice with Russian ambassador to the United States Sergey Kislyak.

In April, Harris voted against the confirmation of Neil Gorsuch to the U.S. Supreme Court. Later that month, she took her first foreign trip to the Middle East, visiting California troops stationed in Iraq and the Zaatari refugee camp in Jordan, the largest camp for Syrian refugees.

In June, Harris garnered media attention for her questioning of Rod Rosenstein, the deputy attorney general, over the role he played in the May 2017 firing of James Comey, the director of the Federal Bureau of Investigation. The prosecutorial nature of her questioning caused Senator John McCain, an ex officio member of the Intelligence Committee, and Senator Richard Burr, the committee chairman, to interrupt her and request that she be more respectful of the witness. A week later, she questioned Jeff Sessions, the attorney general, on the same topic. Sessions said her questioning "makes me nervous". Burr's singling out of Harris sparked suggestions in the news media that his behavior was sexist, with commentators arguing that Burr would not treat a male Senate colleague in a similar manner.

In December, Harris called for the resignation of Senator Al Franken, writing on Twitter, "Sexual harassment and misconduct should not be allowed by anyone and should not occur anywhere."

=== 2018 ===
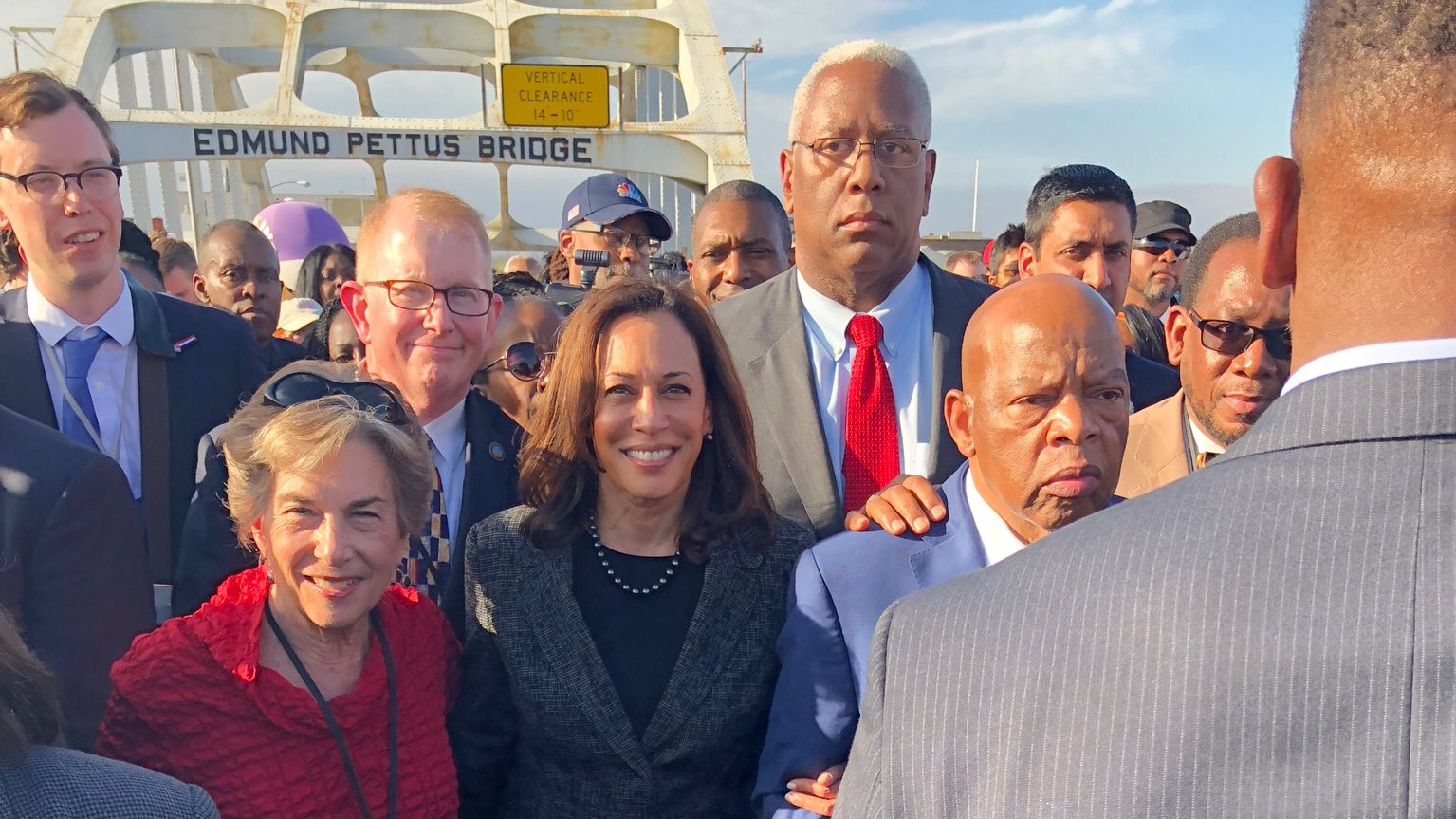
Harris at the commemoration of Bloody Sunday in Selma, Alabama, where she was invited to speak by John Lewis (right), January 2018

In January, Harris was appointed to the Senate Judiciary Committee after Franken resigned. Later that month, she questioned Homeland Security Secretary Kirstjen Nielsen for favoring Norwegian immigrants over others and for claiming to be unaware that Norway is a predominantly white country.

Also in January, Harris and senators Heidi Heitkamp, Jon Tester, and Claire McCaskill co-sponsored the Border and Port Security Act, legislation to mandate that U.S. Customs and Border Protection "hire, train and assign at least 500 officers per year until the number of needed positions the model identifies is filled" and require the commissioner of Customs and Border Protection to determine potential equipment and infrastructure improvements for ports of entry.

In May, Harris heatedly questioned Nielsen about the Trump administration family separation policy, under which children were separated from their families when their parents were taken into custody for illegally entering the U.S. In June, after visiting one of the detention facilities near the border in San Diego, Harris became the first senator to demand Nielsen's resignation.

In the September and October Brett Kavanaugh Supreme Court confirmation hearings, Harris questioned Brett Kavanaugh about a meeting he may have had regarding the Mueller Investigation with a member of Kasowitz Benson Torres, the law firm founded by Donald Trump's personal attorney, Marc Kasowitz. Kavanaugh was unable to answer and repeatedly deflected. Harris also participated in questioning the FBI director's limited scope of the investigation of Kavanaugh regarding allegations of sexual assault. She voted against his confirmation.

Harris was a target of the October 2018 United States mail bombing attempts.

In December, the Senate passed the Justice for Victims of Lynching Act (S. 3178), sponsored by Harris. The bill, which died in the House, would have made lynching a federal hate crime.

=== 2019 ===
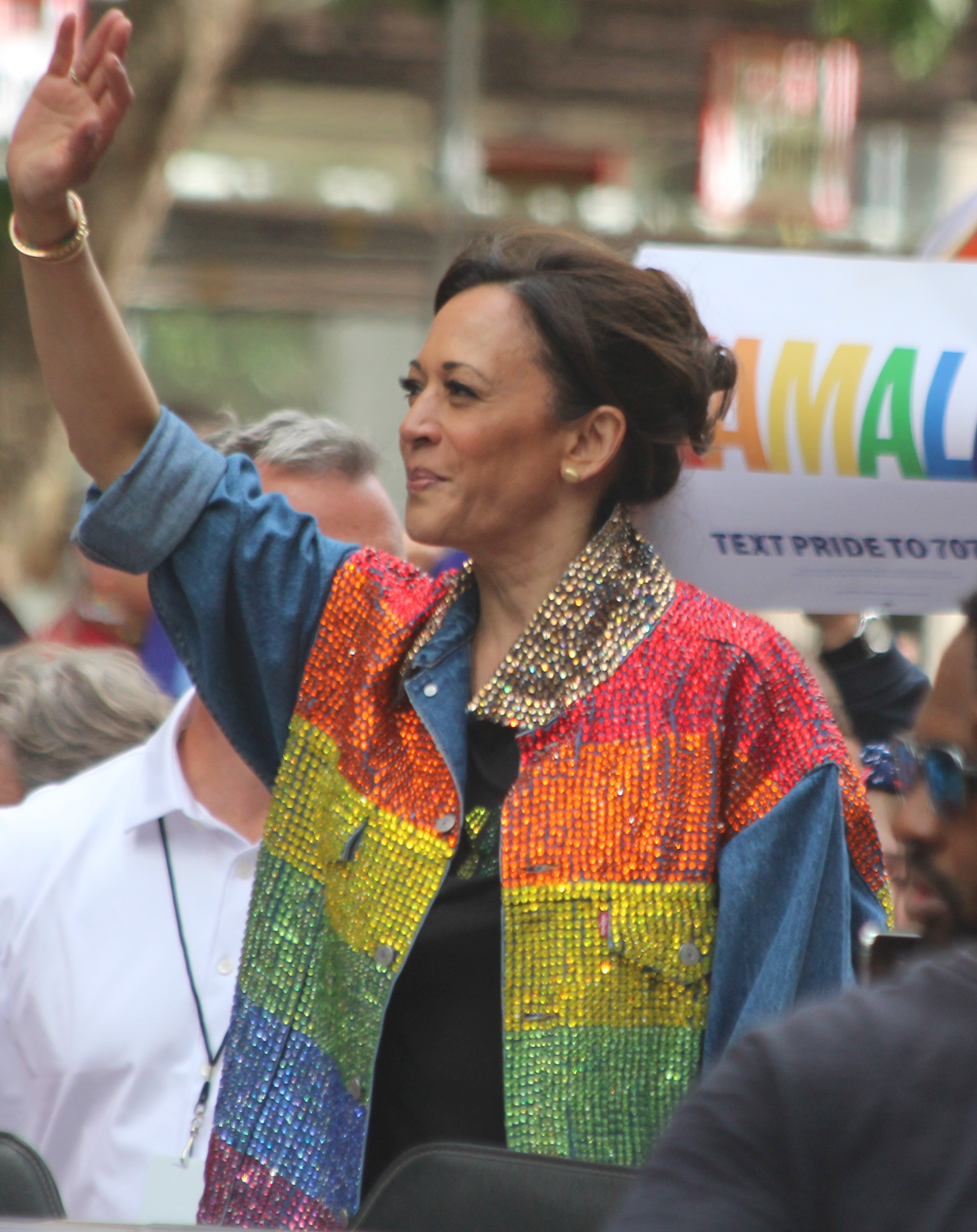
Harris at the San Francisco Pride parade, June 2019

Harris supported busing for desegregation of public schools, saying, "the schools of America are as segregated, if not more segregated, today than when I was in elementary school." She viewed busing as an option to be considered by school districts, rather than the responsibility of the federal government.

Harris was an early co-sponsor of the Green New Deal, a plan to transition the country towards generating 100 percent renewable electricity by 2030.

In March 2019, after special counsel Robert Mueller submitted his report on Russian interference in the 2016 election, Harris called for U.S. attorney general William Barr to testify before Congress in the interests of transparency. Two days later, Barr released a four-page "summary" of the redacted Mueller Report, which was criticized as a deliberate mischaracterization of its conclusions. Later that month, Harris was one of 12 Democratic senators led by Mazie Hirono to sign a letter questioning Barr's decision to offer "his own conclusion that the President's conduct did not amount to obstruction of justice", and called for an investigation into whether Barr's summary of the Mueller report and his statements at a news conference were misleading.

In April 2019, Harris was one of 34 Senate Democrats and independents to write a letter urging President Trump not to cut aid to El Salvador, Guatemala, and Honduras. The group wrote:

We encourage you to listen to members of your own Administration and reverse a decision that will damage our national security and aggravate conditions inside Central America....Since taking office, you have consistently expressed a flawed understanding of U.S. foreign assistance. It is neither charity, nor is it a gift to foreign governments. Our national security funding is specifically designed to promote American interests, enhance our collective security, and protect the safety of our citizens... By obstructing the use of [Fiscal Year 2018] national security funding and seeking to terminate similar funding from [Fiscal Year 2017], you are personally undermining efforts to promote U.S. national security and economic prosperity.

On May 1, 2019, Barr testified before the Senate Judiciary Committee. During the hearing, he remained defiant about the misrepresentations in the four-page summary he had released ahead of the full report. When asked by Harris whether he had reviewed the underlying evidence before deciding not to charge Trump with obstruction of justice, Barr admitted that neither he, Rod Rosenstein, nor anyone in his office had reviewed the evidence supporting the report before making the charging decision. Harris later called for Barr to resign, accusing him of refusing to answer her questions because he could open himself up to perjury, and saying his responses disqualified him from serving as U.S. attorney general. Two days later, Harris demanded again that Department of Justice inspector general Michael E. Horowitz investigate whether Barr acceded to pressure from the White House to investigate Trump's political enemies.

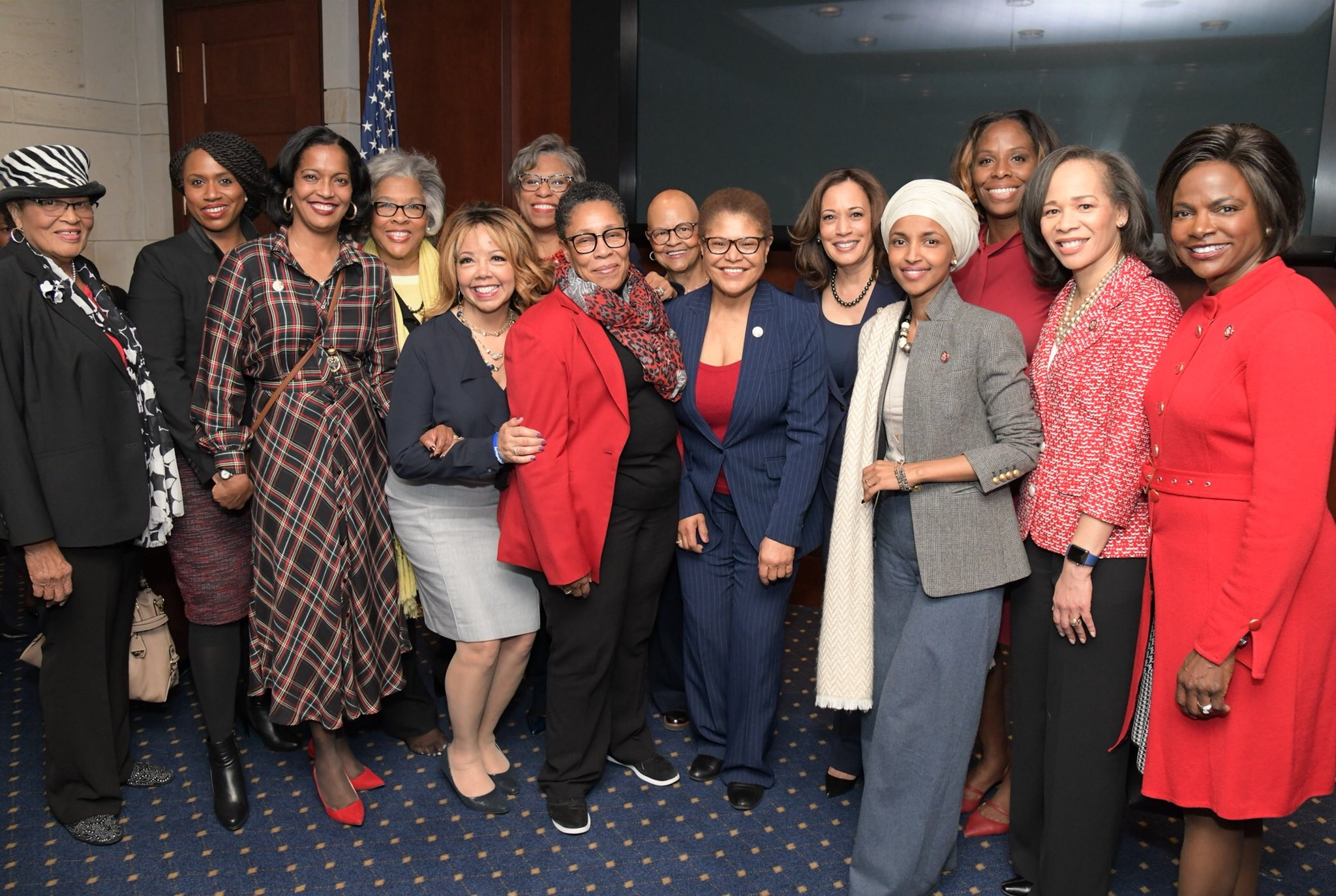
Harris with women of the Congressional Black Caucus in January 2019

On May 5, 2019, Harris said "voter suppression" prevented Democrats Stacey Abrams and Andrew Gillum from winning the 2018 gubernatorial elections in Georgia and Florida; Abrams lost by 55,000 votes and Gillum by 32,000. According to election law expert Richard L. Hasen, "I have seen no good evidence that the suppressive effects of strict voting and registration laws affected the outcome of the governor's races in Georgia and Florida."

In July, Harris teamed with Kirsten Gillibrand to urge the Trump administration to investigate the persecution of Uyghurs in China by the Chinese Communist Party; in this question she was joined by Senator Marco Rubio.

In July, Harris proposed a "Medicare for All" plan, stopping short of eliminating private insurance.

In November, Harris called for an investigation into the death of Roxsana Hernández, a transgender woman and immigrant who died in ICE custody.

In December, Harris led a group of Democratic senators and civil rights organizations in demanding the removal of White House senior adviser Stephen Miller after emails published by the Southern Poverty Law Center revealed frequent promotion of white nationalist literature to Breitbart website editors.

In 2019, GovTrack labelled Harris the "most liberal senator". In 2021, the label was retracted by GovTrack, citing "unreliablity" of their work, and re-designated Harris as the "leftmost Democratic senator".

=== 2020 ===
Harris speaks at Donald Trump's first impeachment trial in January 2020

Before the opening of the impeachment trial of Donald Trump on January 16, 2020, Harris delivered remarks on the floor of the Senate, stating her views on the integrity of the American justice system and the principle that nobody, including an incumbent president, is above the law. She later asked Senate Judiciary chairman Lindsey Graham to halt all judicial nominations during the impeachment trial, to which Graham acquiesced. Harris voted to convict Trump on charges of abuse of power and obstruction of Congress.

Harris worked on bipartisan bills with Republican co-sponsors, including a bail reform bill with Rand Paul, an election security bill with James Lankford, and a workplace harassment bill with Lisa Murkowski.

=== 2021 ===
Following her election as Vice President of the United States, Harris resigned from her seat on January 18, 2021, before taking office on January 20; she was replaced by California secretary of state Alex Padilla.

== Committee assignments ==
While in the Senate, Harris was a member of the following committees:

- Committee on the Budget
- Committee on Homeland Security and Governmental Affairs
  - Subcommittee on Federal Spending Oversight and Emergency Management
  - Subcommittee on Regulatory Affairs and Federal Management
- Select Committee on Intelligence
- Committee on the Judiciary
  - Subcommittee on the Constitution
  - Subcommittee on Oversight, Agency Action, Federal Rights and Federal Courts
  - Subcommittee on Privacy, Technology and the Law

== Caucus memberships ==
- Congressional Asian Pacific American Caucus
- Congressional Black Caucus
- Congressional Caucus for Women's Issues

== 2020 presidential election ==
=== Presidential campaign ===
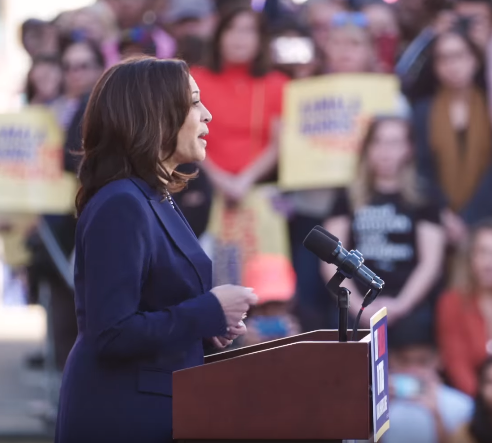
Harris announces her run for the 2020 Democratic nomination for president in Oakland, California, January 2019

Harris had been considered a top contender and potential front-runner for the 2020 Democratic nomination for president. In June 2018, she said she was "not ruling it out". In July 2018, it was announced that she would publish a memoir, a sign of a possible run. On January 21, 2019, Harris officially announced her candidacy for president of the United States in the 2020 presidential election. In the first 24 hours after her announcement, she tied a record set by Bernie Sanders in 2016 for the most donations raised in the day after an announcement. More than 20,000 people attended her campaign launch event in her hometown of Oakland, California, on January 27, according to a police estimate.

During the first Democratic presidential debate in June 2019, Harris scolded former vice president Joe Biden for "hurtful" remarks he made, speaking fondly of senators who opposed integration efforts in the 1970s and working with them to oppose mandatory school bussing. Harris's support rose by between six and nine points in polls after that debate. In the second debate in August, Biden and Representative Tulsi Gabbard confronted Harris over her record as attorney general. The San Jose Mercury News assessed that some of Gabbard's and Biden's accusations were on point, such as blocking the DNA testing of a death row inmate, while others did not withstand scrutiny. In the immediate aftermath of the debate, Harris fell in the polls. Over the next few months her poll numbers fell to the low single digits. Harris faced criticism from reformers for tough-on-crime policies she pursued while she was California's attorney general. In 2014, she defended California's death penalty in court.

Before and during her presidential campaign, an online informal organization using the hashtag #KHive formed to support Harris's candidacy and defend her from racist and sexist attacks. According to the Daily Dot, Joy Reid first used the term in an August 2017 tweet saying "@DrJasonJohnson @ZerlinaMaxwell and I had a meeting and decided it's called the K-Hive."

On December 3, 2019, Harris withdrew from the 2020 presidential election, citing a shortage of funds. In March 2020, she endorsed Joe Biden for president.

=== Vice presidential campaign ===
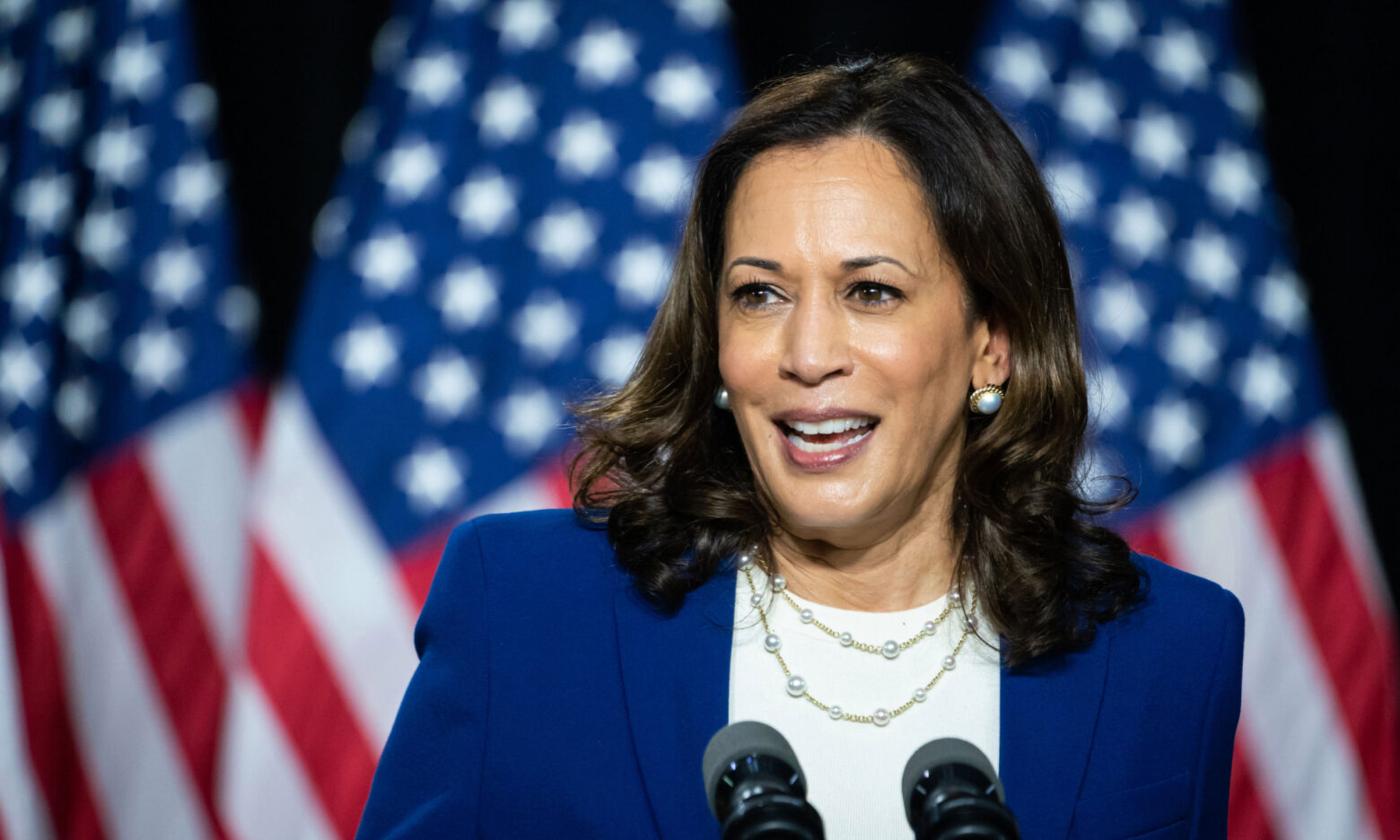
Harris announces her candidacy for vice president in Wilmington, Delaware, August 2020

In May 2019, senior members of the Congressional Black Caucus endorsed the idea of a Biden–Harris ticket. In late February 2020, Biden won a landslide victory in the 2020 South Carolina Democratic primary with the endorsement of House whip Jim Clyburn, with more victories on Super Tuesday. In early March, Clyburn suggested Biden choose a black woman as a running mate, saying, "African American women needed to be rewarded for their loyalty". In March, Biden committed to choosing a woman for his running mate.

On April 17, 2020, Harris responded to media speculation and said she "would be honored" to be Biden's running mate. In late May, in relation to the murder of George Floyd and ensuing protests and demonstrations, Biden faced renewed calls to select a black woman as his running mate, highlighting the law enforcement credentials of Harris and Val Demings.

On June 12, The New York Times reported that Harris was emerging as the front-runner to be Biden's running mate, as she was the only African American woman with the political experience typical of vice presidents. On June 26, CNN reported that more than a dozen people close to the Biden search process considered Harris one of Biden's top four contenders, along with Elizabeth Warren, Val Demings, and Keisha Lance Bottoms.

On August 11, 2020, Biden announced he had chosen Harris. She was the first African American, the first Indian American, and the third woman after Geraldine Ferraro and Sarah Palin to be the vice-presidential nominee on a major-party ticket. Harris is also the first resident of the Western United States to appear on the Democratic Party's national ticket.

Harris became the vice president–elect after Biden won the 2020 presidential election.

== Vice presidency (2021–2025) ==
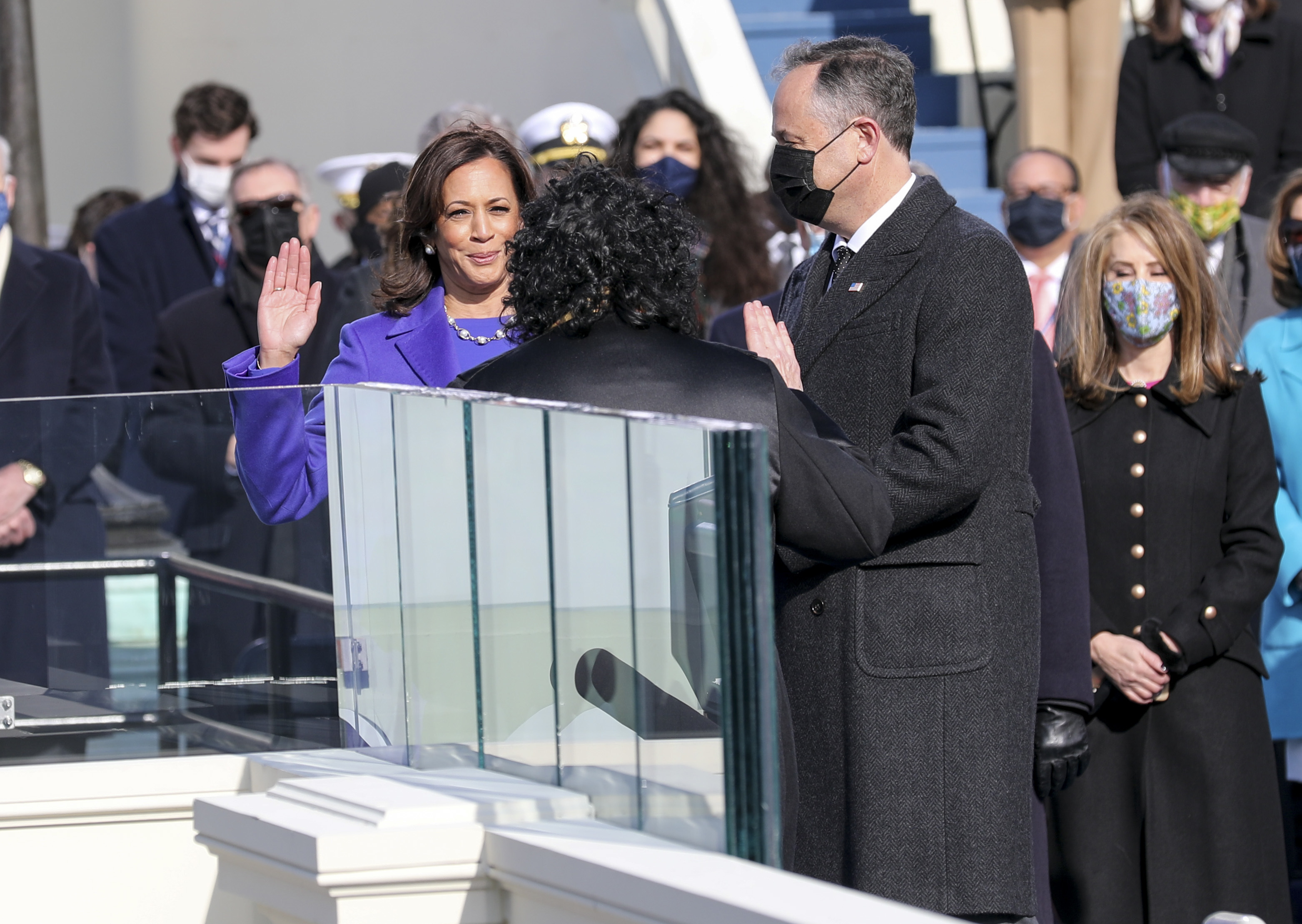
Harris being sworn in as vice president by Supreme Court Justice Sonia Sotomayor on January 20, 2021

Harris was sworn in as vice president on 11:40 a.m. on January 20, 2021, by Justice Sonia Sotomayor. She is the United States' first woman vice president, first African-American vice president, and first Asian-American vice president. Harris is the third person with acknowledged non-European ancestry to become president or vice president. (Note: The other two are President Barack Obama, and Charles Curtis, a Native American and member of the Kaw Nation, who was vice president under Herbert Hoover from 1929 to 1933.)

=== Senate presidency ===
When Harris took office, the 117th Congress's Senate was divided 50–50 between Republicans and Democrats; this meant that she was often called upon to exercise her power to cast tie-breaking votes as president of the Senate. Harris cast her first two tie-breaking votes on February 5. In February and March, Harris's tie-breaking votes were required to pass the American Rescue Plan Act of 2021 stimulus package Biden proposed, since no Senate Republicans voted for it. On July 20, Harris broke Mike Pence's record for tie-breaking votes in the first year of a vice presidency when she cast the seventh tie-breaking vote in her first six months. She cast 13 tie-breaking votes during her first year in office, the most tie-breaking votes in a single year in U.S. history, surpassing John Adams, who cast 12 in 1790. On December 5, 2023, Harris broke the record for the most tie-breaking votes cast by a vice president, casting her 32nd vote, exceeding John C. Calhoun, who cast 31 votes during his nearly eight years in office. When she left office, she had cast 33 such votes. On November 19, 2021, Harris served as acting president from 10:10 to 11:35 am EST while Biden underwent a colonoscopy. She was the first woman, and the third person overall, to assume the powers and duties of the presidency as acting president of the United States.

As early as December 2021, Harris was identified as playing a pivotal role in the Biden administration owing to her tie-breaking vote in the evenly divided Senate as well as her being the presumed front-runner in 2024 if Biden did not seek reelection.

=== List of tie-breaking votes by Kamala Harris ===
Kamala Harris cast a record 33 tie-breaking votes during her vice presidency. Harris cast her first two tie-breaking votes on February 5. In February and March, Harris's tie-breaking votes were required to pass the American Rescue Plan Act of 2021 stimulus package Biden proposed, since no Senate Republicans voted for it. On July 20, Harris broke Mike Pence's record for tie-breaking votes in the first year of a vice presidency when she cast the seventh tie-breaking vote in her first six months. She cast 13 tie-breaking votes during her first year in office, the most tie-breaking votes in a single year in U.S. history, surpassing John Adams, who cast 12 in 1790. On December 5, 2023, Harris broke the record for the most tie-breaking votes cast by a vice president, casting her 32nd vote, exceeding John C. Calhoun, who cast 31 votes during his nearly eight years in office. She would break her own record for the most tie-breaking votes cast by a vice president when she voted to confirm Loren AliKhan to a judgeship. This was the 33rd and final tie-breaking vote Harris cast.

Date	Action	Vote	Ultimate result
February 5, 2021	S.Amdt. 888 (Schumer amendment, in the nature of a substitute) to S.Con.Res. 5	Yea: 51–50	Amendment agreed to.
February 5, 2021	S.Con.Res. 5 (as amended): a concurrent resolution setting forth the congressional budget for the United States Government for fiscal year 2021 and setting forth the appropriate budgetary levels for fiscal years 2022 through 2030	Yea: 51–50	Concurrent resolution adopted.
March 4, 2021	Motion to proceed to H.R. 1319, the American Rescue Plan Act of 2021	Yea: 51–50	Motion agreed to.
April 21, 2021	Motion to discharge PN79-6 (Nomination of Colin Hackett Kahl, of California, to be Under Secretary of Defense for Policy)	Yea: 51–50	Motion agreed to.
June 22, 2021	Motion to invoke cloture on PN220 (Nomination of Kiran Arjandas Ahuja, of Massachusetts, to be Director of the Office of Personnel Management for a term of four years)	Yea: 51–50	Motion agreed to.
June 22, 2021	PN220 (Nomination of Kiran Arjandas Ahuja, of Massachusetts, to be Director of the Office of Personnel Management for a term of four years)	Yea: 51–50	Nomination confirmed.
July 20, 2021	Motion to invoke cloture on PN126 (Nomination of Jennifer Ann Abruzzo, of New York, to be General Counsel of the National Labor Relations Board for a term of four years)	Yea: 51–50	Motion agreed to.
July 21, 2021	PN126 (Nomination of Jennifer Ann Abruzzo, of New York, to be General Counsel of the National Labor Relations Board for a term of four years)	Yea: 51–50	Nomination confirmed.
September 30, 2021	Motion to invoke cloture on PN116 (Nomination of Rohit Chopra, of Washington, D.C., to be Director of the Bureau of Consumer Financial Protection for a term of five years)	Yea: 51–50	Motion agreed to.
October 20, 2021	Motion to invoke cloture on PN572 (Nomination of Catherine Elizabeth Lhamon, of California, to be Assistant Secretary for Civil Rights, Department of Education)	Yea: 51–50	Motion agreed to.
October 20, 2021	PN572 (Nomination of Catherine Elizabeth Lhamon, of California, to be Assistant Secretary for Civil Rights, Department of Education)	Yea: 51–50	Nomination confirmed.
November 3, 2021	Motion to discharge PN807 (Nomination of Jennifer Sung, of Oregon, to be United States Circuit Judge for the Ninth Circuit)	Yea: 50–49	Motion agreed to.
November 17, 2021	Motion to invoke cloture on PN604 (Nomination of Brian Eddie Nelson, of California, to be Under Secretary for Terrorism and Financial Crimes)	Yea: 51–50	Motion agreed to.
December 8, 2021	Motion to invoke cloture on PN930 (Nomination of Rachael S. Rollins, of Massachusetts, to be United States Attorney for the District of Massachusetts)	Yea: 51–50	Motion agreed to.
December 8, 2021	PN930 (Nomination of Rachael S. Rollins, of Massachusetts, to be United States Attorney for the District of Massachusetts)	Yea: 51–50	Nomination confirmed.
March 30, 2022	Motion to discharge PN1541 (Nomination of Alvaro M. Bedoya, of Maryland, to be Federal Trade Commissioner for the term of seven years from September 26, 2019)	Yea: 51–50	Motion agreed to.
April 5, 2022	Motion to discharge PN1523 (Nomination of Julia Ruth Gordon, of Maryland, to be an Assistant Secretary of Housing and Urban Development)	Yea: 51–50	Motion agreed to.
May 10, 2022	PN1679 (Nomination of Lisa DeNell Cook, of Michigan, to be a Member of the Board of Governors of the Federal Reserve System for the unexpired term of fourteen years from February 1, 2010)	Yea: 51–50	Nomination confirmed.
May 11, 2022	Motion to invoke cloture on PN1541 (Nomination of Alvaro M. Bedoya, of Maryland, to be Federal Trade Commissioner for the term of seven years from September 26, 2019)	Yea: 51–50	Motion agreed to.
May 11, 2022	PN1541 (Nomination of Alvaro M. Bedoya, of Maryland, to be Federal Trade Commissioner for the term of seven years from September 26, 2019)	Yea: 51–50	Nomination confirmed.
May 11, 2022	Motion to invoke cloture on PN1523 (Nomination of Julia Ruth Gordon, of Maryland, to be Assistant Secretary of Housing and Urban Development)	Yea: 51–50	Motion agreed to.
May 11, 2022	PN1523 (Nomination of Julia Ruth Gordon, of Maryland, to be Assistant Secretary of Housing and Urban Development)	Yea: 51–50	Nomination confirmed.
May 12, 2022	Motion to discharge PN1542 (Nomination of Mary T. Boyle, of Maryland, to be a Commissioner of the Consumer Product Safety Commission)	Yea: 51–50	Motion agreed to.
August 6, 2022	Motion to proceed to H.R. 5376, the legislative vehicle for the Inflation Reduction Act of 2022	Yea: 51–50	Motion agreed to.
August 7, 2022	S.Amdt. 5488 to H.R. 5376, the Inflation Reduction Act of 2022	Yea: 51–50	Amendment agreed to.
August 7, 2022	H.R. 5376, the Inflation Reduction Act of 2022	Yea: 51–50	H.R. 5376 passed, as amended.
February 28, 2023	PN76 (Nomination of Araceli Martínez-Olguín, of California, to be United States District Judge for the Northern District of California)	Yea: 49–48	Nomination confirmed.
February 28, 2023	Motion to invoke cloture on PN77 (Nomination of Margaret R. Guzman, of Massachusetts, to be United States District Judge for the District of Massachusetts)	Yea: 49–48	Motion agreed to.
March 1, 2023	PN77 (Nomination of Margaret R. Guzman, of Massachusetts, to be United States District Judge for the District of Massachusetts)	Yea: 49–48	Nomination confirmed.
June 21, 2023	Motion to invoke cloture on PN82 (Nomination of Natasha C. Merle, of New York, to be United States District Judge for the Eastern District of New York)	Yea: 51–50	Motion agreed to.
July 12, 2023	Motion to invoke cloture on PN64 (Nomination of Kalpana Kotagal, of Ohio, to be a Member of the Equal Employment Opportunity Commission for a term expiring July 1, 2027)	Yea: 51–50	Motion agreed to. Kotagal was confirmed the next day (July 13).
December 5, 2023	Motion to invoke cloture on PN588 (Nomination of Loren L. AliKhan, of the District of Columbia, to be United States District Judge for the District of Columbia)	Yea: 51–50	Motion agreed to.
December 5, 2023	PN588 (Nomination of Loren L. AliKhan, of the District of Columbia, to be United States District Judge for the District of Columbia)	Yea: 51–50	Nomination confirmed.

== Political positions ==
Harris's domestic platform supports national abortion protections, LGBTQ+ rights, stricter gun control, and limited legislation to address climate change. On immigration, she supports an earned pathway to citizenship and increases in border security, as well as addressing the root causes of illegal immigration by means of the RCS program.

On foreign policy, Harris supports continued military aid to Ukraine and Israel in their respective wars, but insists that Israel should agree to a ceasefire and hostage deal and work toward a two-state solution. She opposes an arms embargo on Israel. Harris has departed from Biden on economic issues, proposing what has been called a "populist" economic agenda.

=== Abortion ===
Harris supports abortion rights, and reproductive health care was central to her presidential campaign. She has been called "the Biden administration's voice for reproductive rights" and "the White House's voice of unflinching support for reproductive health rights." Several abortion rights and women's organizations supported her after Biden withdrew from the race, with Reproductive Freedom for All saying "there is nobody who has fought as hard [as Harris] for abortion rights and access" and EMILY's List calling her "our most powerful advocate and messenger" on reproductive rights.

As of 2020, Harris had a 100% rating from the abortion rights advocacy group Planned Parenthood Action Fund, and a 0% rating from the anti-abortion group National Right to Life Committee. EMILY's List endorsed her in 2015, during her senatorial campaign.

=== LGBT rights ===
As California attorney general, Harris refused to defend Prop 8 in federal court, and after Prop 8 was struck down in Hollingsworth v. Perry in 2013, she ordered the Los Angeles County Clerk's office to "start the marriages immediately". She officiated at the wedding of the plaintiffs in the case, Kris Perry and Sandy Stier, at San Francisco City Hall.

As a member of the U.S. Senate, Harris co-sponsored the Equality Act.

In July 2018, Harris led her colleagues in introducing the Gay and Trans Panic Defense Prohibition Act of 2018, a nationwide bill that would curtail the effectiveness of the so-called gay and trans panic defenses, an issue she pioneered as district attorney of San Francisco.

In October 2019, Harris participated in a CNN/Human Rights Campaign town hall on LGBTQ rights and pledged her support for "all of the folks who are fighting for equality" in cases that would determine whether gay and transgender people are protected under laws banning federal workplace discrimination. Harris drew attention to the epidemic of hate crimes committed against Black trans women (at the time 20 killed that year), noting that LGBTQ people of color are doubly discriminated against.

Harris has since been criticized for a 2015 federal court motion she filed to block gender-affirming medical care for a transgender inmate serving in a California state prison while she was California attorney general, after the Ninth Circuit Court of Appeals had ruled that denying that treatment violated the 8th Amendment's prohibition of cruel and unusual punishment.

=== Criminal justice ===
In December 2018, Harris voted for the First Step Act, legislation aimed at reducing recidivism rates among federal prisoners by expanding job training and other programs, in addition to forming an expansion of early release programs and modifications on sentencing laws such as mandatory minimum sentences for nonviolent drug offenders, "to more equitably punish drug offenders".

In March 2020, Harris was one of 15 senators to sign a letter to the Federal Bureau of Prisons and private prison companies GEO Group, CoreCivic, and Management and Training Corporation requesting information on their strategy to address the COVID-19 pandemic, asserting that it was "critical that [you] have a plan to help prevent the spread of the novel coronavirus to incarcerated individuals and correctional staff, along with their families and loved ones, and provide treatment to incarcerated individuals and staff who become infected."

In June 2020, after a campaign by a coalition of community groups, including Black Lives Matter, Los Angeles Mayor Eric Garcetti announced Los Angeles Police Department budget cuts of $150 million. Harris supported the decision:

In 2020 Harris tweeted in support of donations to the Minnesota Freedom Fund, a bail fund assisting those arrested in the George Floyd protests, though she did not donate to the fund herself.

Harris's criminal justice record has been seen as mixed, with critics calling her "tough on crime" even though she called herself a "progressive prosecutor", citing her reluctance to release prisoners and anti-truancy policies. In her 2009 book, Harris criticized liberals for what she called "biases against law enforcement".

== See also ==
- Black women in American politics
- Charles Curtis
- Vice presidency of Kamala Harris
- List of African-American United States Cabinet members
- List of African-American United States Senate candidates
- List of African-American United States senators
- List of Asian Americans and Pacific Islands Americans in the United States Congress
- List of female state attorneys general in the United States
- List of female United States Cabinet members
- List of female United States presidential and vice presidential candidates
- List of United States politicians of Indian descent
- List of United States senators from California
- Women in the United States Senate
