= List of vice presidential trips made by Kamala Harris =

This is a list of vice presidential trips made by Kamala Harris from 2021 to 2025, during her tenure as the 49th vice president of the United States under President Joe Biden. The list documents official travel outside the Washington metropolitan area, including domestic and international destinations. This list excludes trips made within Washington, D.C., the U.S. federal capital in which the Number One Observatory Circle, the official residence of the vice president, is located. Also excluded are trips to Camp David, the country residence of the president, as well as Joint Base Andrews. Harris made 18 international trips to 22 countries during her vice presidency. The number of visits per state or territory where she traveled are: One: Alaska, Colorado, Connecticut, Idaho, Iowa, Kansas, Kentucky, Maine, Maryland, Massachusetts, Minnesota, Mississippi, Missouri, Montana, Nebraska, New Hampshire, New Mexico, New York, North Dakota, Ohio, Oklahoma, Oregon, Rhode Island, South Carolina, South Dakota, Tennessee, Texas, Utah, Vermont, Virginia, Washington, West Virginia, Wisconsin, Wyoming Two: Arizona, Florida, Hawaii, Illinois, Indiana, Louisiana, Nevada, New Jersey, North Carolina, Pennsylvania Three: Georgia Four: Michigan Five or more: California

== 2021 ==
=== March ===
Country/ U.S. state	Areas visited	Dates	Details
Colorado	Denver	March 16	Vice President Harris visited Denver to promote the American Rescue Plan and met with small business owners.
Nevada	Las Vegas	March 15	Vice President Harris visited Las Vegas to highlight the administration's COVID-19 relief efforts.
New Jersey	Newark, Montclair	March 22	Vice President Harris visited a COVID-19 vaccination site at Essex County College in Newark and delivered remarks on the administration's vaccination efforts. She later participated in a roundtable with community leaders in Montclair.

=== April ===
Country/ U.S. state	Areas visited	Dates	Details
California	Oakland, San Leandro	April 5	Vice President Harris visited a vaccination site at the Allen Temple Baptist Church in Oakland and toured the East Oakland Immunization Clinic in San Leandro, highlighting the administration's equity-focused vaccination strategy.
Illinois	Chicago	April 19	Vice President Harris visited a vaccination site in Chicago and promoted vaccination efforts.

=== May ===
Country/ U.S. state	Areas visited	Dates	Details
Wisconsin	Milwaukee	May 6	Vice President Harris visited Milwaukee to highlight the American Jobs Plan.
Rhode Island	Providence	May 7	Vice President Harris visited the Rhode Island Convention Center vaccination site and met with Governor Dan McKee to discuss infrastructure investments.

=== June ===
Country/ U.S. state	Areas visited	Dates	Details
South Carolina	Greenville	June 14	Vice President Harris visited Greenville to promote vaccination efforts.
Pennsylvania	Pittsburgh	June 23	Vice President Harris visited Pittsburgh to discuss infrastructure.
Texas	El Paso	June 25	Vice President Harris visited the U.S.-Mexico border in El Paso to address migration issues.
Guatemala	Guatemala City	June 6–7	Vice President Harris met with President Alejandro Giammattei and addressed the root causes of migration. She delivered remarks warning migrants: "Do not come."
Mexico	Mexico City	June 7–8	Vice President Harris met with President Andrés Manuel López Obrador and signed agreements on migration and economic development.

=== July ===
Country/ U.S. state	Areas visited	Dates	Details
Michigan	Detroit	July 12	Vice President Harris visited a vaccination site at the TCF Center and encouraged vaccinations amid the Delta variant surge.
Nevada	Las Vegas	July 27	Vice President Harris promoted the administration's infrastructure plan at a union training center.

=== August ===
Country/ U.S. state	Areas visited	Dates	Details
Singapore	Singapore	August 22–24	Vice President Harris met with Prime Minister Lee Hsien Loong and President Halimah Yacob, strengthening Indo-Pacific ties.
Vietnam	Hanoi, Ho Chi Minh City	August 24–26	Vice President Harris met with President Nguyễn Xuân Phúc and announced a CDC regional office. She addressed China in the South China Sea.

=== September ===
Country/ U.S. state	Areas visited	Dates	Details
Virginia	Hampton	September 10	Vice President Harris visited Hampton University to discuss voting rights.

=== October ===
Country/ U.S. state	Areas visited	Dates	Details
South Carolina	Columbia	October 8	Vice President Harris visited Columbia as part of the Get Out the Vote tour.
Georgia	Atlanta	October 8	Vice President Harris visited Atlanta as part of the Get Out the Vote tour.
Michigan	Ann Arbor	October 8	Vice President Harris visited Ann Arbor as part of the Get Out the Vote tour.
New York	The Bronx	October 22	Vice President Harris visited the Bronx to promote the Build Back Better agenda.
New Jersey	Lakewood	October 22	Vice President Harris visited Lakewood to promote the Build Back Better agenda.

=== November ===
Country/ U.S. state	Areas visited	Dates	Details
France	Paris	November 8–12	Vice President Harris attended the Paris Peace Forum and met with President Emmanuel Macron, repairing U.S.-France relations after the AUKUS deal.
Ohio	Columbus	November 19	Vice President Harris visited Columbus to highlight infrastructure investments.

=== December ===
Country/ U.S. state	Areas visited	Dates	Details
California	Los Angeles	December 2	Vice President Harris visited Los Angeles to promote infrastructure.

== 2022 ==
=== January ===
Country/ U.S. state	Areas visited	Dates	Details
Honduras	Tegucigalpa	January 27	Vice President Harris attended the inauguration of President Xiomara Castro and held bilateral meetings on migration.

=== February ===
Country/ U.S. state	Areas visited	Dates	Details
Germany	Munich	February 17–20	Vice President Harris led the U.S. delegation to the Munich Security Conference, warning Russia against invading Ukraine and reaffirming NATO commitments.

=== March ===
Country/ U.S. state	Areas visited	Dates	Details
Poland	Warsaw	March 9–10	Vice President Harris met with Polish leaders to discuss support for Ukraine amid the Russian invasion.
Romania	Bucharest	March 11	Vice President Harris met with Romanian President Klaus Iohannis to reaffirm NATO commitments.
Louisiana	Sunset, New Orleans	March 21	Vice President Harris promoted broadband investments in rural Louisiana and highlighted the Infrastructure Investment and Jobs Act.

=== April ===
Country/ U.S. state	Areas visited	Dates	Details
California	Los Angeles, San Bernardino	April 6–7	Vice President Harris announced investments in electric buses and toured a clean transit facility.

=== May ===
Country/ U.S. state	Areas visited	Dates	Details
New York	Buffalo	May 14	Vice President Harris attended the funeral of a Buffalo shooting victim.
New York	New York City	May 23	Vice President Harris spoke on reproductive rights.

=== June ===
Country/ U.S. state	Areas visited	Dates	Details
Georgia	Atlanta, Plainfield	June 7	Vice President Harris attended the funeral of a Buffalo shooting victim and visited a farm impacted by discrimination.

=== September ===
Country/ U.S. state	Areas visited	Dates	Details
Texas	Houston	September 9	Vice President Harris promoted voting rights and met with abortion providers post-Dobbs.
South Korea	Seoul	September 26–29	Vice President Harris visited the DMZ and met with South Korean leaders.
Japan	Tokyo	September 26–28	Vice President Harris led the U.S. delegation to Abe's funeral and held bilateral meetings.

=== October ===
Country/ U.S. state	Areas visited	Dates	Details
Illinois	Chicago	October 11	Vice President Harris discussed reproductive rights post-Roe.

=== November ===
Country/ U.S. state	Areas visited	Dates	Details
Thailand	Bangkok	November 18–20	Vice President Harris attended the APEC summit and met with regional leaders.
Philippines	Manila, Palawan	November 21–22	Vice President Harris met with President Bongbong Marcos and visited Palawan to affirm U.S. commitment to the region.

== 2023 ==
=== March ===
Country/ U.S. state	Areas visited	Dates	Details
Ghana	Accra	March 26–28	Vice President Harris met with President Nana Akufo-Addo and announced investments in youth and digital economy.
Tanzania	Dar es Salaam	March 29–30	Vice President Harris met with President Samia Suluhu Hassan and promoted women's empowerment.

=== April ===
Country/ U.S. state	Areas visited	Dates	Details
Zambia	Lusaka	March 31–April 1	Vice President Harris met with President Hakainde Hichilema and announced $7 billion in commitments.

=== June ===
Country/ U.S. state	Areas visited	Dates	Details
Colorado	Denver	June 9	Vice President Harris promoted clean energy investments.

=== September ===
Country/ U.S. state	Areas visited	Dates	Details
Indonesia	Jakarta	September 6–7	Vice President Harris attended the ASEAN Summit in President Biden's stead and met with regional leaders.

=== November ===
Country/ U.S. state	Areas visited	Dates	Details
United Kingdom	London	November 1–2	Vice President Harris attended the AI Safety Summit and discussed global AI governance.

=== December ===
Country/ U.S. state	Areas visited	Dates	Details
United Arab Emirates	Dubai	December 2	Vice President Harris attended COP28 and announced U.S. climate commitments.
United Kingdom	London	December 3	Vice President Harris held bilateral meetings on Gaza ceasefire.

== 2024 ==
=== January ===
Country/ U.S. state	Areas visited	Dates	Details
South Carolina	Myrtle Beach, Columbia	January 6–8	Vice President Harris spoke at the AME Women's Retreat and NAACP MLK Day event on voting rights.

=== February ===
Country/ U.S. state	Dates	Details	
Germany	Munich	February 16–17	Vice President Harris attended the Munich Security Conference and met with President Volodymyr Zelenskyy.

=== March ===
Country/ U.S. state	Areas visited	Dates	Details
Georgia	Atlanta	March 8	Vice President Harris visited an abortion clinic and spoke on reproductive rights.
Puerto Rico	San Juan	March 22	Vice President Harris announced investments in hurricane recovery.

=== April ===
Country/ U.S. state	Areas visited	Dates	Details
Nevada	Las Vegas	April 24	Vice President Harris launched the Economic Opportunity Tour.

=== May ===
Country/ U.S. state	Areas visited	Dates	Details
Georgia	Atlanta	May 9	Vice President Harris continued the Economic Opportunity Tour.

=== June ===
Country/ U.S. state	Areas visited	Dates	Details
Switzerland	Lucerne	June 15	Vice President Harris attended the Ukraine Peace Summit.
Michigan	Kalamazoo	June 17	Vice President Harris moderated a conversation with actress Taraji P. Henson on reproductive health.

=== July ===
Country/ U.S. state	Areas visited	Dates	Details
Louisiana	New Orleans	July 9	Vice President Harris addressed the American Federation of Teachers and Essence Festival.
Nevada	Las Vegas	July 9	Vice President Harris spoke at a campaign rally after President Biden's NATO summit.
Texas	Dallas	July 10	Vice President Harris addressed the Alpha Kappa Alpha sorority.
Indiana	Indianapolis	July 24	Vice President Harris spoke at Zeta Phi Beta Grand Boulé.

=== August ===
Country/ U.S. state	Areas visited	Dates	Details
Illinois	Chicago	August 11	Vice President Harris addressed Everytown for Gun Safety's Gun Sense University.

=== September ===
Country/ U.S. state	Areas visited	Dates	Details
Pennsylvania	Pittsburgh, Johnstown	September 3	Vice President Harris campaigned on Labor Day.
Michigan	Hamtramck	September 5	Vice President Harris rallied with Oprah Winfrey.
Arizona	Douglas	September 27	Vice President Harris visited the U.S.-Mexico border and proposed tougher asylum restrictions.

=== October ===
Country/ U.S. state	Areas visited	Dates	Details
North Carolina	Greensboro	October 5	Vice President Harris assessed Hurricane Helene damage.
Laos	Vientiane	October 10–11	Vice President Harris attended the ASEAN Summit in President Biden's stead.
Michigan	Detroit, Flint	October 18	Vice President Harris campaigned with Lizzo and appeared on multiple media outlets.
Georgia	Atlanta	October 19	Vice President Harris rallied with Usher and appeared on podcasts.
Texas	Houston	October 25	Vice President Harris rallied with Beyoncé on reproductive rights.

=== November ===
Country/ U.S. state	Areas visited	Dates	Details
Pennsylvania	Philadelphia, Allentown, Reading	November 3–4	Vice President Harris held final campaign rallies ahead of Election Day.

== 2025 ==
=== January ===
Country/ U.S. state	Areas visited	Dates	Details
Singapore	Singapore	January 15	Vice President Harris made a working visit to Singapore to strengthen bilateral ties.
Bahrain	Manama	January 16	Vice President Harris visited Bahrain to discuss regional security.
Germany	Munich	January 17	Vice President Harris attended meetings in Germany as part of her final foreign trip.

== See also ==
Vice Presidency of Kamala Harris
