= Vice presidency of Kamala Harris =

U.S. vice presidential tenure from 2021 to 2025

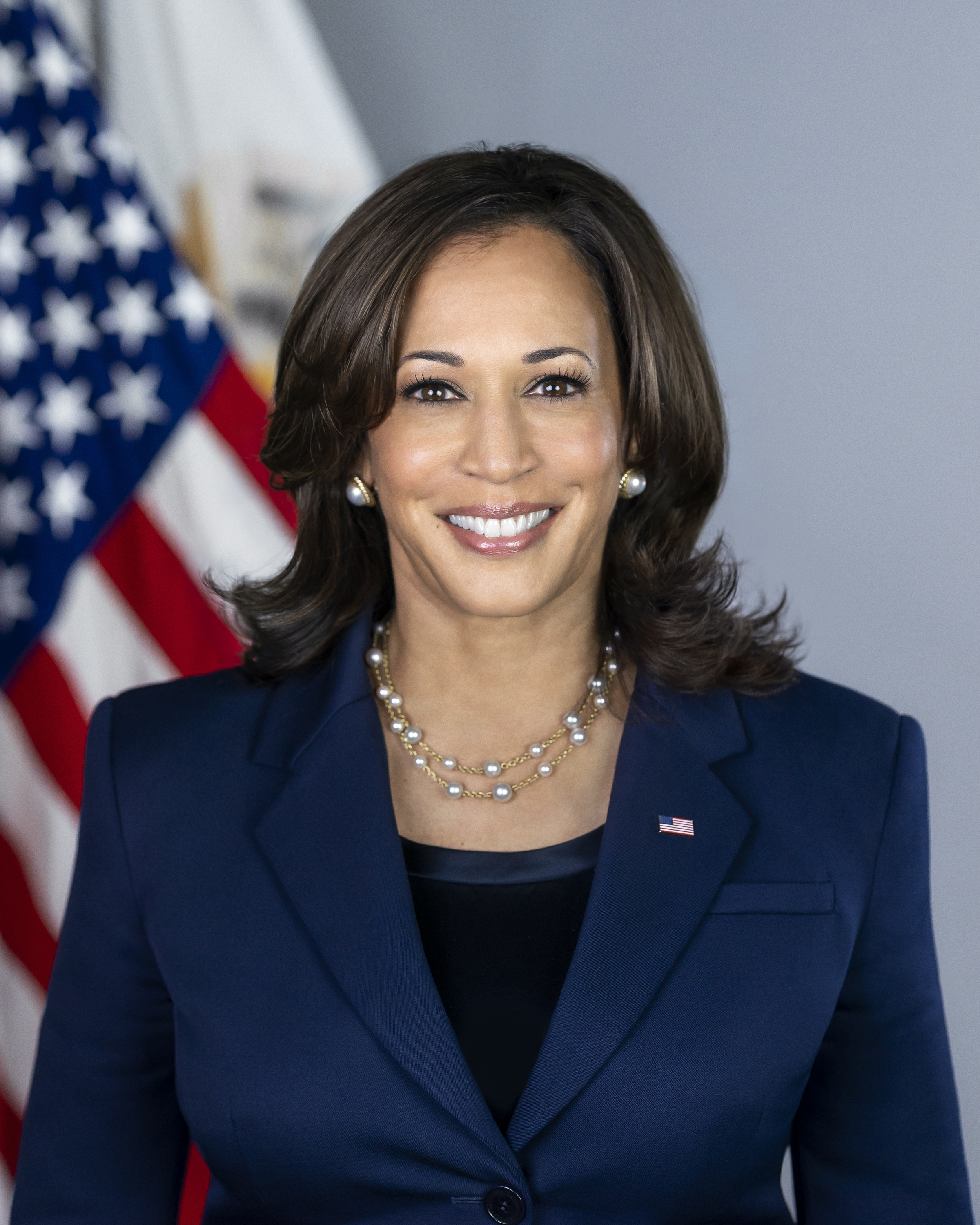
- Official portrait, 2021
- Vice Presidency of Kamala Harris; January 20, 2021 – January 20, 2025
- President: Joe Biden
- Cabinet: See list
- Party: Democratic
- Election: 2020
- Seat: Number One Observatory Circle
- Seal of the Vice President

Kamala Harris served as the 49th vice president of the United States during the presidency of Joe Biden from January 20, 2021, to January 20, 2025. Harris, a member of the Democratic Party who previously served as the junior U.S. senator representing California from 2017 to 2021, was selected as former vice president Biden's running mate and took office following their victory in the 2020 presidential election over Republican incumbent president Donald Trump and vice president Mike Pence. In her role as President of the United States Senate, she cast more tie-breaking votes than any other vice president. Harris was the first woman vice president, Black American vice president, and Asian American vice president.

The Biden-Harris transition was marked by Pence's refusal to obey Trump's orders to overturn the 2020 United States presidential election during the January 6, 2021 United States Capitol attack. Alongside Harris' vice presidency, the Democratic Party also held their majorities in the House of Representatives and the Senate during the 117th U.S. Congress following the 2020 elections, attained an overall federal government trifecta. Presiding over an evenly split U.S. Senate upon entering office, Harris cast a record 33 tie-breaking votes to confirm presidential appointments and pass the American Rescue Plan Act of 2021 and the Inflation Reduction Act of 2022.

In July 2024, after Biden ultimately withdrew his candidacy for re-election, Harris immediately launched her own presidential campaign with his endorsement. She later became the nominee and selected Minnesota governor Tim Walz as her running mate. They lost the 2024 election to the Republican ticket of former president Trump and his running mate, junior Ohio senator JD Vance. As vice president in her capacity as the president of the Senate, Harris oversaw the certification of Trump and Vance as the winners of the election on January 6, 2025. Biden and Harris were succeeded in office by Trump and Vance on January 20, 2025.

== 2020 presidential election ==
=== Presidential campaign ===
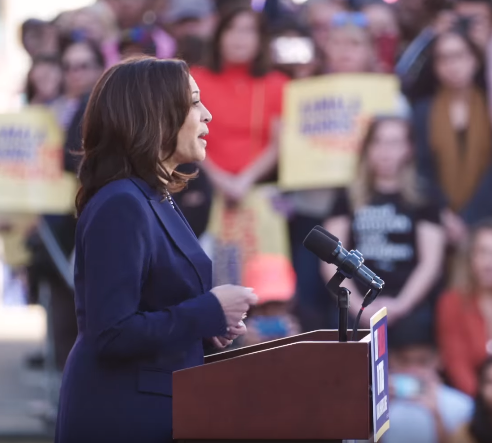
Harris announces her run for the 2020 Democratic nomination for president in Oakland, California, January 2019

Harris had been considered a top contender and potential front-runner for the 2020 Democratic nomination for president. In June 2018, she said she was "not ruling it out". In July 2018, it was announced that she would publish a memoir, a sign of a possible run. On January 21, 2019, Harris officially announced her candidacy for president of the United States in the 2020 presidential election. In the first 24 hours after her announcement, she tied a record set by Bernie Sanders in 2016 for the most donations raised in the day after an announcement. More than 20,000 people attended her campaign launch event in her hometown of Oakland, California, on January 27, according to a police estimate.

During the first Democratic presidential debate in June 2019, Harris scolded former vice president Joe Biden for "hurtful" remarks he made, speaking fondly of senators who opposed integration efforts in the 1970s and working with them to oppose mandatory school bussing. Harris's support rose by between six and nine points in polls after that debate. In the second debate in August, Biden and Representative Tulsi Gabbard confronted Harris over her record as attorney general. The San Jose Mercury News assessed that some of Gabbard's and Biden's accusations were on point, such as blocking the DNA testing of a death row inmate, while others did not withstand scrutiny. In the immediate aftermath of the debate, Harris fell in the polls. Over the next few months her poll numbers fell to the low single digits. Harris faced criticism from reformers for tough-on-crime policies she pursued while she was California's attorney general. In 2014, she defended California's death penalty in court.

Before and during her presidential campaign, an online informal organization using the hashtag #KHive formed to support Harris's candidacy and defend her from racist and sexist attacks. According to the Daily Dot, Joy Reid first used the term in an August 2017 tweet saying "@DrJasonJohnson @ZerlinaMaxwell and I had a meeting and decided it's called the K-Hive."

On December 3, 2019, Harris withdrew from the 2020 presidential election, citing a shortage of funds. In March 2020, she endorsed Joe Biden for president.

=== Vice presidential campaign ===
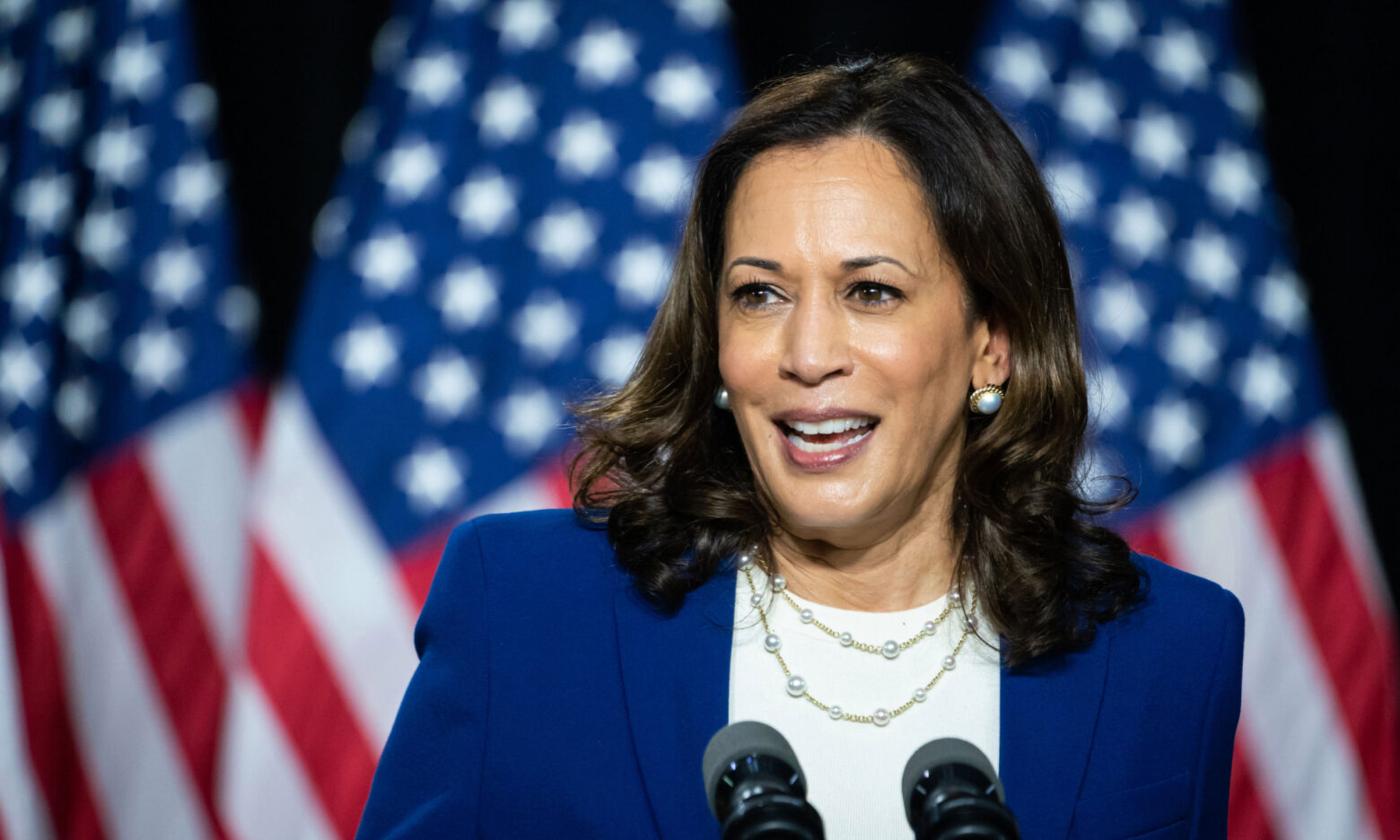
Harris announces her candidacy for vice president in Wilmington, Delaware, August 2020

In May 2019, senior members of the Congressional Black Caucus endorsed the idea of a Biden–Harris ticket. In late February 2020, Biden won a landslide victory in the 2020 South Carolina Democratic primary with the endorsement of House whip Jim Clyburn, with more victories on Super Tuesday. In early March, Clyburn suggested Biden choose a black woman as a running mate, saying, "African American women needed to be rewarded for their loyalty". In March, Biden committed to choosing a woman for his running mate.

On April 17, 2020, Harris responded to media speculation and said she "would be honored" to be Biden's running mate. In late May, in relation to the murder of George Floyd and ensuing protests and demonstrations, Biden faced renewed calls to select a black woman as his running mate, highlighting the law enforcement credentials of Harris and Val Demings.

On June 12, The New York Times reported that Harris was emerging as the front-runner to be Biden's running mate, as she was the only African American woman with the political experience typical of vice presidents. On June 26, CNN reported that more than a dozen people close to the Biden search process considered Harris one of Biden's top four contenders, along with Elizabeth Warren, Val Demings, and Keisha Lance Bottoms.

On August 11, 2020, Biden announced he had chosen Harris. She was the first African American, the first Indian American, and the third woman after Geraldine Ferraro and Sarah Palin to be the vice-presidential nominee on a major-party ticket. Harris is also the first resident of the Western United States to appear on the Democratic Party's national ticket.

Harris became the vice president–elect after Biden won the 2020 presidential election.

== Vice presidency (2021–2025) ==
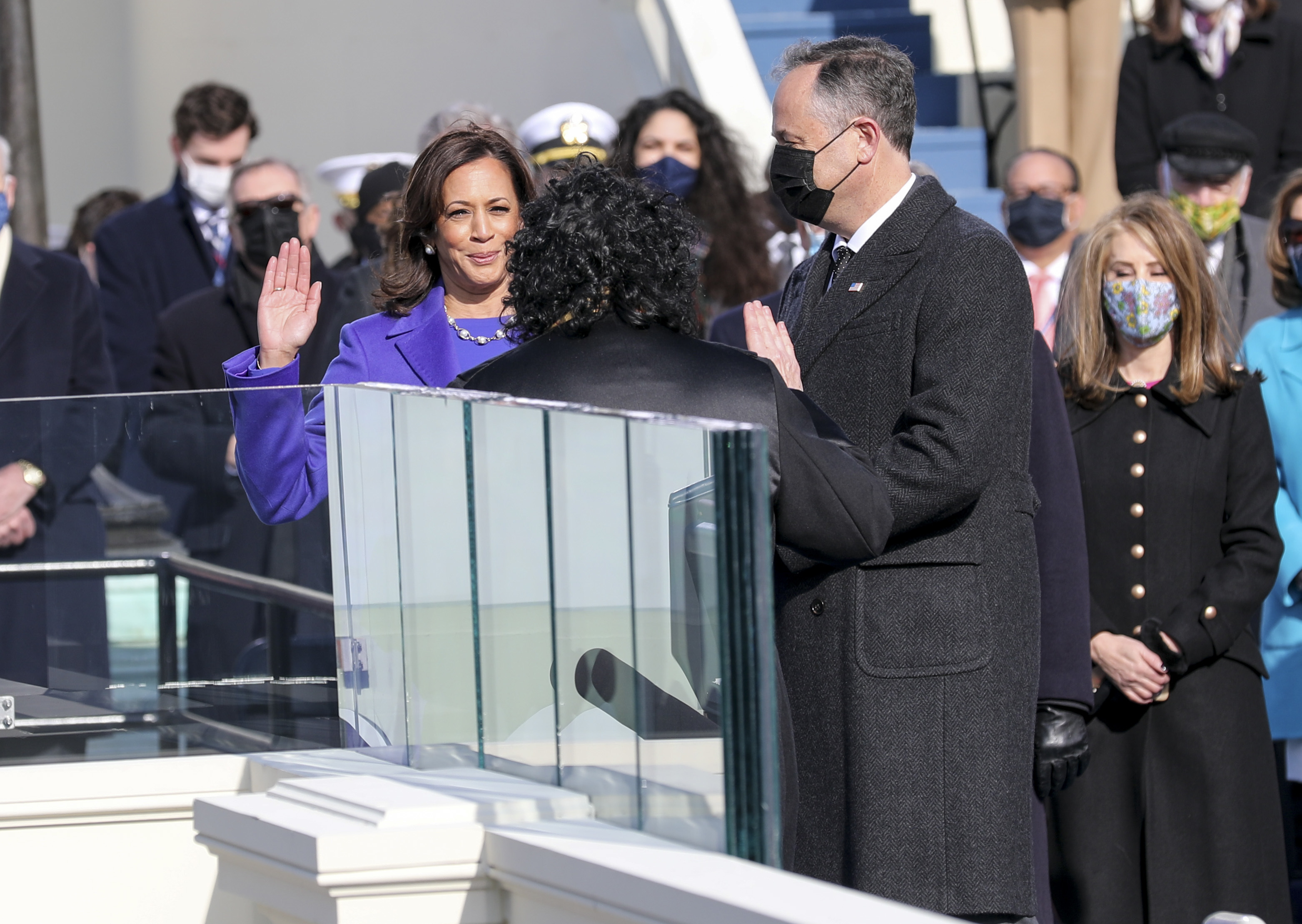
Harris being sworn in as vice president by Supreme Court Justice Sonia Sotomayor on January 20, 2021

Harris was sworn in as vice president on 11:40 a.m. on January 20, 2021, by Justice Sonia Sotomayor. She is the United States' first woman vice president, first African-American vice president, and first Asian-American vice president. Harris is the third person with acknowledged non-European ancestry to become president or vice president. (Note: The other two are President Barack Obama, and Charles Curtis, a Native American and member of the Kaw Nation, who was vice president under Herbert Hoover from 1929 to 1933.)

Her first act as vice president was to swear in three new senators: Alex Padilla (her successor in the Senate) and Georgia senators Raphael Warnock and Jon Ossoff.

On November 19, 2021, Harris served as acting president from 10:10 to 11:35 am EST while Biden underwent a colonoscopy. She was the first woman, and the third person overall, to assume the powers and duties of the presidency as acting president of the United States.

== Senate presidency ==
As early as December 2021, Harris was identified as playing a pivotal role in the Biden administration owing to her tie-breaking vote in the evenly divided Senate as well as her being the presumed front-runner in 2024 if Biden did not seek reelection.

When Harris took office, the 117th Congress's Senate was divided 50–50 between Republicans and Democrats; this meant that she was often called upon to exercise her power to cast tie-breaking votes as president of the Senate.

=== List of tie-breaking votes cast by Kamala Harris ===
Kamala Harris cast a record 33 tie-breaking votes during her vice presidency. Harris cast her first two tie-breaking votes on February 5. In February and March, Harris's tie-breaking votes were required to pass the American Rescue Plan Act of 2021 stimulus package Biden proposed, since no Senate Republicans voted for it. On July 20, Harris broke Mike Pence's record for tie-breaking votes in the first year of a vice presidency when she cast the seventh tie-breaking vote in her first six months. She cast 13 tie-breaking votes during her first year in office, the most tie-breaking votes in a single year in U.S. history, surpassing John Adams, who cast 12 in 1790. On December 5, 2023, Harris broke the record for the most tie-breaking votes cast by a vice president, casting her 32nd vote, exceeding John C. Calhoun, who cast 31 votes during his nearly eight years in office. She would break her own record for the most tie-breaking votes cast by a vice president when she voted to confirm Loren AliKhan to a judgeship. This was the 33rd and final tie-breaking vote Harris cast.

Date	Action	Vote	Ultimate result
February 5, 2021	S.Amdt. 888 (Schumer amendment, in the nature of a substitute) to S.Con.Res. 5	Yea: 51–50	Amendment agreed to.
February 5, 2021	S.Con.Res. 5 (as amended): a concurrent resolution setting forth the congressional budget for the United States Government for fiscal year 2021 and setting forth the appropriate budgetary levels for fiscal years 2022 through 2030	Yea: 51–50	Concurrent resolution adopted.
March 4, 2021	Motion to proceed to H.R. 1319, the American Rescue Plan Act of 2021	Yea: 51–50	Motion agreed to.
April 21, 2021	Motion to discharge PN79-6 (Nomination of Colin Hackett Kahl, of California, to be Under Secretary of Defense for Policy)	Yea: 51–50	Motion agreed to.
June 22, 2021	Motion to invoke cloture on PN220 (Nomination of Kiran Arjandas Ahuja, of Massachusetts, to be Director of the Office of Personnel Management for a term of four years)	Yea: 51–50	Motion agreed to.
June 22, 2021	PN220 (Nomination of Kiran Arjandas Ahuja, of Massachusetts, to be Director of the Office of Personnel Management for a term of four years)	Yea: 51–50	Nomination confirmed.
July 20, 2021	Motion to invoke cloture on PN126 (Nomination of Jennifer Ann Abruzzo, of New York, to be General Counsel of the National Labor Relations Board for a term of four years)	Yea: 51–50	Motion agreed to.
July 21, 2021	PN126 (Nomination of Jennifer Ann Abruzzo, of New York, to be General Counsel of the National Labor Relations Board for a term of four years)	Yea: 51–50	Nomination confirmed.
September 30, 2021	Motion to invoke cloture on PN116 (Nomination of Rohit Chopra, of Washington, D.C., to be Director of the Bureau of Consumer Financial Protection for a term of five years)	Yea: 51–50	Motion agreed to.
October 20, 2021	Motion to invoke cloture on PN572 (Nomination of Catherine Elizabeth Lhamon, of California, to be Assistant Secretary for Civil Rights, Department of Education)	Yea: 51–50	Motion agreed to.
October 20, 2021	PN572 (Nomination of Catherine Elizabeth Lhamon, of California, to be Assistant Secretary for Civil Rights, Department of Education)	Yea: 51–50	Nomination confirmed.
November 3, 2021	Motion to discharge PN807 (Nomination of Jennifer Sung, of Oregon, to be United States Circuit Judge for the Ninth Circuit)	Yea: 50–49	Motion agreed to.
November 17, 2021	Motion to invoke cloture on PN604 (Nomination of Brian Eddie Nelson, of California, to be Under Secretary for Terrorism and Financial Crimes)	Yea: 51–50	Motion agreed to.
December 8, 2021	Motion to invoke cloture on PN930 (Nomination of Rachael S. Rollins, of Massachusetts, to be United States Attorney for the District of Massachusetts)	Yea: 51–50	Motion agreed to.
December 8, 2021	PN930 (Nomination of Rachael S. Rollins, of Massachusetts, to be United States Attorney for the District of Massachusetts)	Yea: 51–50	Nomination confirmed.
March 30, 2022	Motion to discharge PN1541 (Nomination of Alvaro M. Bedoya, of Maryland, to be Federal Trade Commissioner for the term of seven years from September 26, 2019)	Yea: 51–50	Motion agreed to.
April 5, 2022	Motion to discharge PN1523 (Nomination of Julia Ruth Gordon, of Maryland, to be an Assistant Secretary of Housing and Urban Development)	Yea: 51–50	Motion agreed to.
May 10, 2022	PN1679 (Nomination of Lisa DeNell Cook, of Michigan, to be a Member of the Board of Governors of the Federal Reserve System for the unexpired term of fourteen years from February 1, 2010)	Yea: 51–50	Nomination confirmed.
May 11, 2022	Motion to invoke cloture on PN1541 (Nomination of Alvaro M. Bedoya, of Maryland, to be Federal Trade Commissioner for the term of seven years from September 26, 2019)	Yea: 51–50	Motion agreed to.
May 11, 2022	PN1541 (Nomination of Alvaro M. Bedoya, of Maryland, to be Federal Trade Commissioner for the term of seven years from September 26, 2019)	Yea: 51–50	Nomination confirmed.
May 11, 2022	Motion to invoke cloture on PN1523 (Nomination of Julia Ruth Gordon, of Maryland, to be Assistant Secretary of Housing and Urban Development)	Yea: 51–50	Motion agreed to.
May 11, 2022	PN1523 (Nomination of Julia Ruth Gordon, of Maryland, to be Assistant Secretary of Housing and Urban Development)	Yea: 51–50	Nomination confirmed.
May 12, 2022	Motion to discharge PN1542 (Nomination of Mary T. Boyle, of Maryland, to be a Commissioner of the Consumer Product Safety Commission)	Yea: 51–50	Motion agreed to.
August 6, 2022	Motion to proceed to H.R. 5376, the legislative vehicle for the Inflation Reduction Act of 2022	Yea: 51–50	Motion agreed to.
August 7, 2022	S.Amdt. 5488 to H.R. 5376, the Inflation Reduction Act of 2022	Yea: 51–50	Amendment agreed to.
August 7, 2022	H.R. 5376, the Inflation Reduction Act of 2022	Yea: 51–50	H.R. 5376 passed, as amended.
February 28, 2023	PN76 (Nomination of Araceli Martínez-Olguín, of California, to be United States District Judge for the Northern District of California)	Yea: 49–48	Nomination confirmed.
February 28, 2023	Motion to invoke cloture on PN77 (Nomination of Margaret R. Guzman, of Massachusetts, to be United States District Judge for the District of Massachusetts)	Yea: 49–48	Motion agreed to.
March 1, 2023	PN77 (Nomination of Margaret R. Guzman, of Massachusetts, to be United States District Judge for the District of Massachusetts)	Yea: 49–48	Nomination confirmed.
June 21, 2023	Motion to invoke cloture on PN82 (Nomination of Natasha C. Merle, of New York, to be United States District Judge for the Eastern District of New York)	Yea: 51–50	Motion agreed to.
July 12, 2023	Motion to invoke cloture on PN64 (Nomination of Kalpana Kotagal, of Ohio, to be a Member of the Equal Employment Opportunity Commission for a term expiring July 1, 2027)	Yea: 51–50	Motion agreed to. Kotagal was confirmed the next day (July 13).
December 5, 2023	Motion to invoke cloture on PN588 (Nomination of Loren L. AliKhan, of the District of Columbia, to be United States District Judge for the District of Columbia)	Yea: 51–50	Motion agreed to.
December 5, 2023	PN588 (Nomination of Loren L. AliKhan, of the District of Columbia, to be United States District Judge for the District of Columbia)	Yea: 51–50	Nomination confirmed.

== Immigration ==
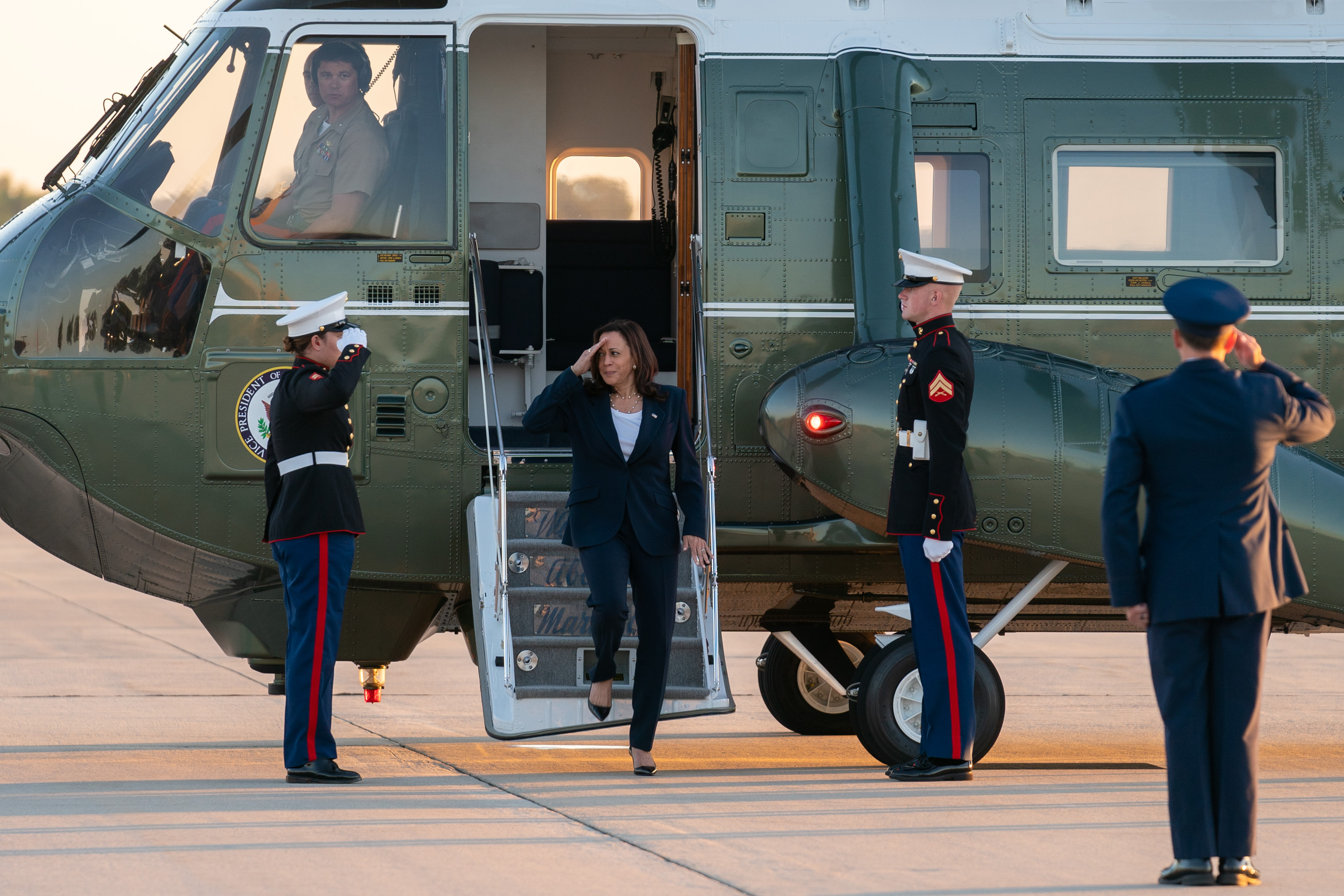
Harris disembarks Marine Two at Joint Base Andrews beginning a trip to El Paso, Texas, June 2021

On March 24, 2021, Biden assigned Harris to work with Mexico and Northern Triangle nations (El Salvador, Guatemala, and Honduras) to stem irregular migration to the Mexico–United States border and address the root causes of migration. The Root Causes Strategy (RCS) was the product of this effort. Multiple news organizations at the time described Harris as a "border czar", though Harris rejected the title and never actually held it. Republicans and other critics began using the term "border czar" to tie Harris to the Mexico–United States border crisis, including in a July 2024 House resolution, despite her having no authority over the border itself.

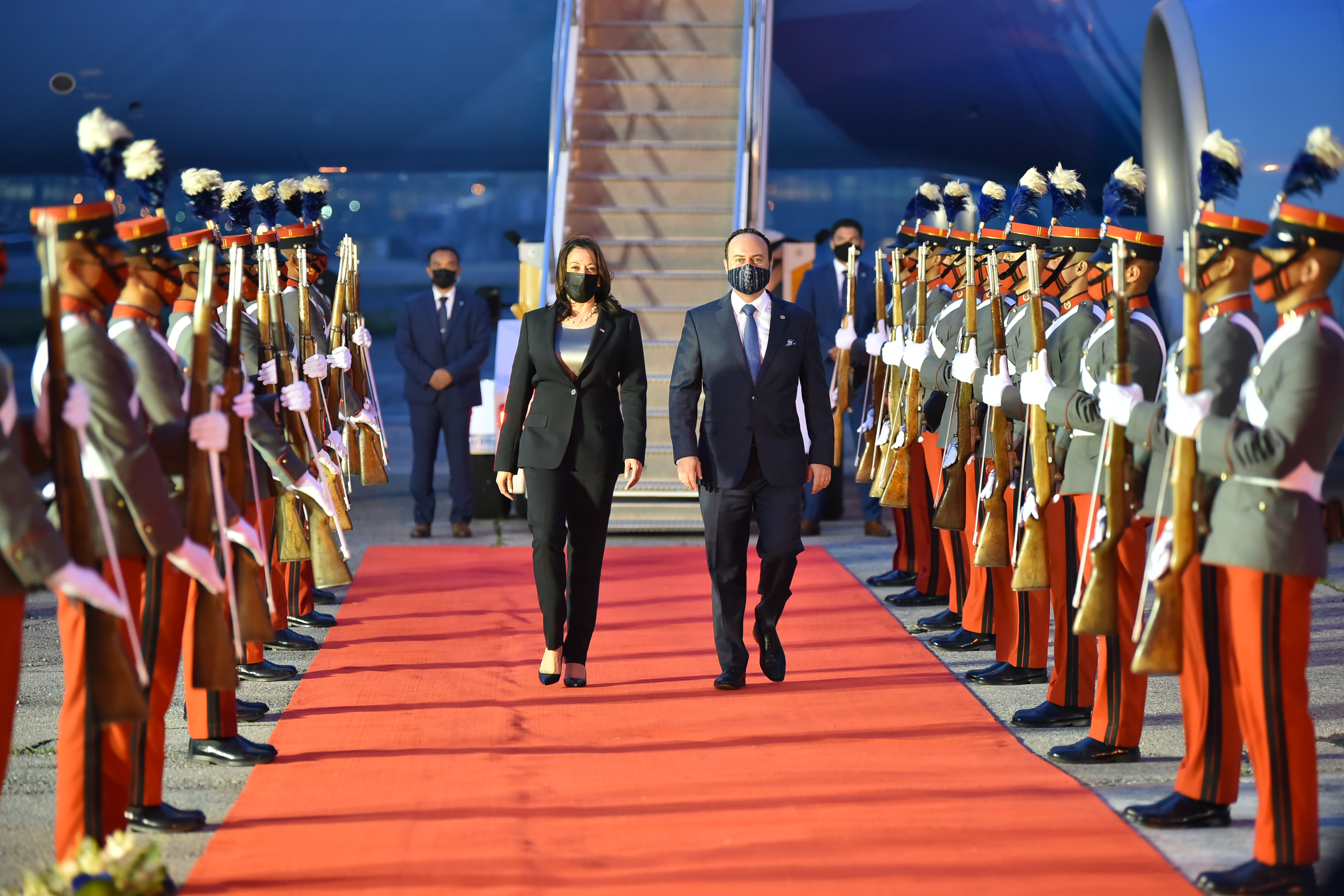
Harris arrives in Guatemala City during her first foreign trip as vice president, June 2021

Harris conducted her first international trip as vice president in June 2021, visiting Guatemala and Mexico in an attempt to address the root causes of an increase in migration from Central America to the United States. During her visit, in a joint press conference with Guatemalan president Alejandro Giammattei, Harris issued an appeal to potential migrants: "I want to be clear to folks in the region who are thinking about making that dangerous trek to the United States-Mexico border: Do not come. Do not come." Her work in Central America led to creation of:

- Task forces on corruption and human trafficking
- The Partnership for Central America
- The women's empowerment program in Her Hands, part of the Partnership for Central America
- Investment funds for housing and businesses

== Foreign policy ==
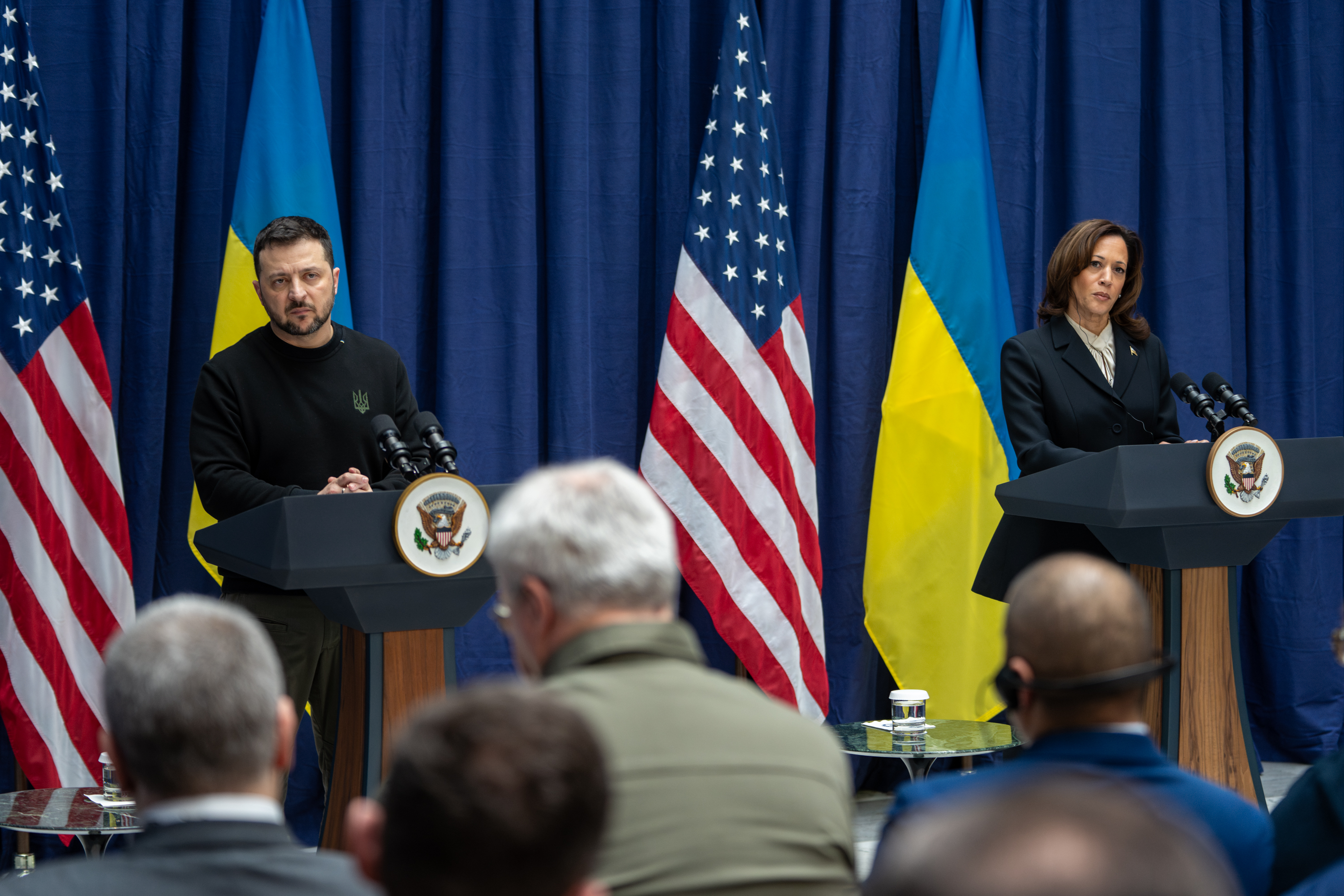
Vice President Harris at a press conference at the Commerzbank in Munich with Ukrainian president Volodymyr Zelenskyy, February 2024

Harris met with French president Emmanuel Macron in November 2021 to strengthen ties after the contentious cancellation of a submarine program. Another meeting was held in November 2022 during Macron's visit to the U.S., resulting in an agreement to strengthen U.S.–France space cooperation across civil, commercial, and national security sectors.

In April 2021, Harris said she was the last person in the room before Biden decided to remove all U.S. troops from Afghanistan, adding that Biden had "an extraordinary amount of courage" and "make[s] decisions based on what he truly believes ... is the right thing to do". National Security Advisor Jake Sullivan said that Biden "insists she be in every core decision-making meeting. She weighs in during those meetings, often providing unique perspectives." Harris assumed a "key diplomatic role" in the Biden administration, particularly after the Russian invasion of Ukraine in February 2022, after which she was dispatched to Germany and Poland to rally support for arming Ukraine and imposing sanctions on Russia.

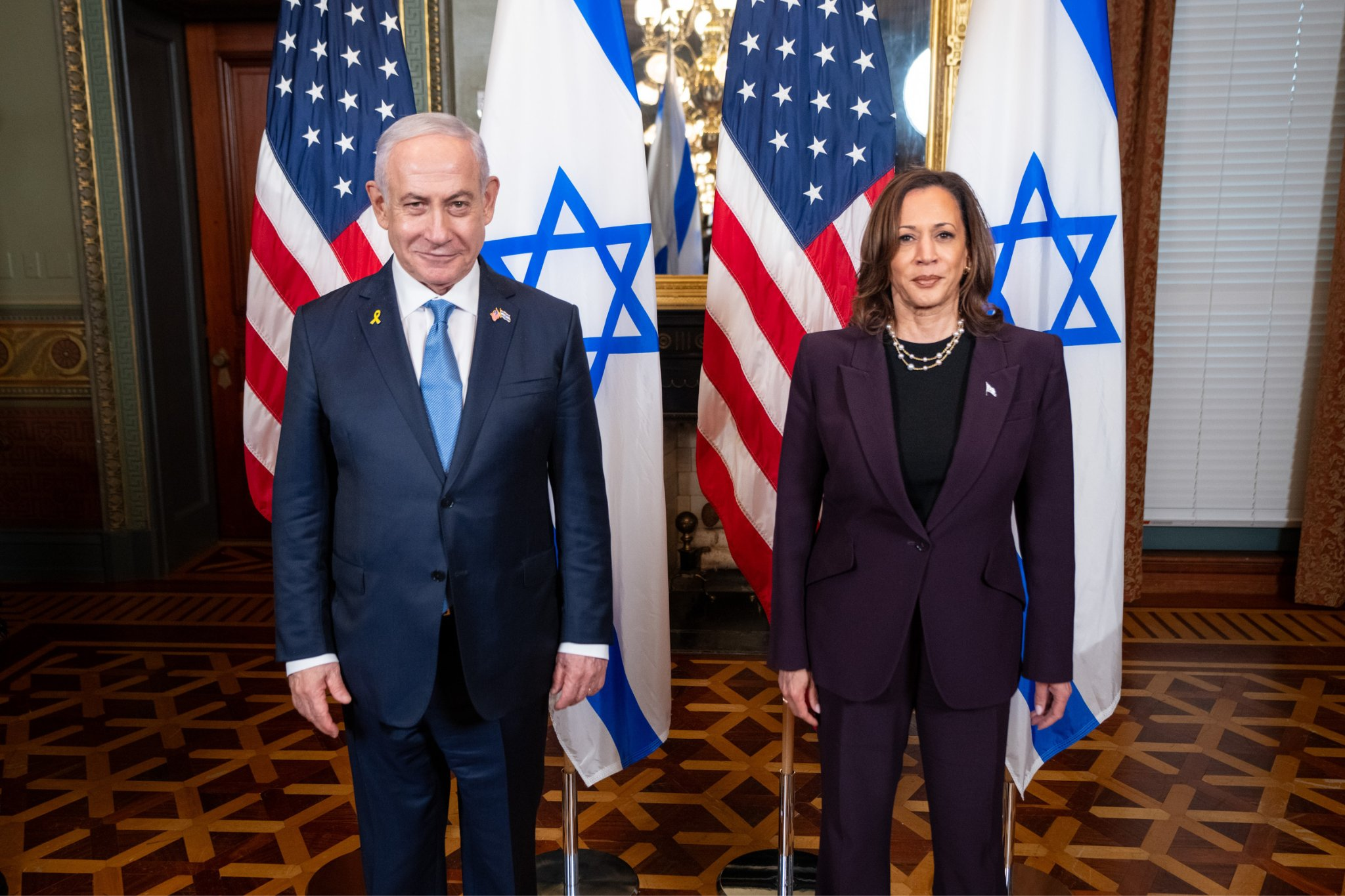
Harris meeting with Israeli Prime Minister Benjamin Netanyahu at the White House on July 25, 2024

In April 2023, Harris visited Goddard Space Flight Center in Maryland with South Korean president Yoon Suk Yeol and agreed to work to strengthen the space alliance between the U.S. and South Korea. "We renew our commitment to strengthen our cooperation in the next frontier of our expanding alliance, and of course that is space," Harris said at a joint news conference with Yoon.

In November 2023, Harris pledged that the Biden administration would place no conditions on U.S. aid to Israel in its war with Hamas in Gaza. In March 2024, she criticized Israel's actions during the Gaza war, saying, "Given the immense scale of suffering in Gaza, there must be an immediate ceasefire for at least the next six weeks...This will get the hostages out and get a significant amount of aid in."

== 2024 presidential election ==
=== Vice-presidential campaign ===
In April 2023, President Joe Biden initially announced his reelection campaign, with Harris widely expected to remain as his running mate. After the Democratic primaries, the pair became the party's presumptive nominees in the 2024 presidential election. Concerns about Biden's age and health persisted throughout Biden's first term, with renewed scrutiny after his performance in the first presidential debate, on June 27.

=== Presidential campaign ===
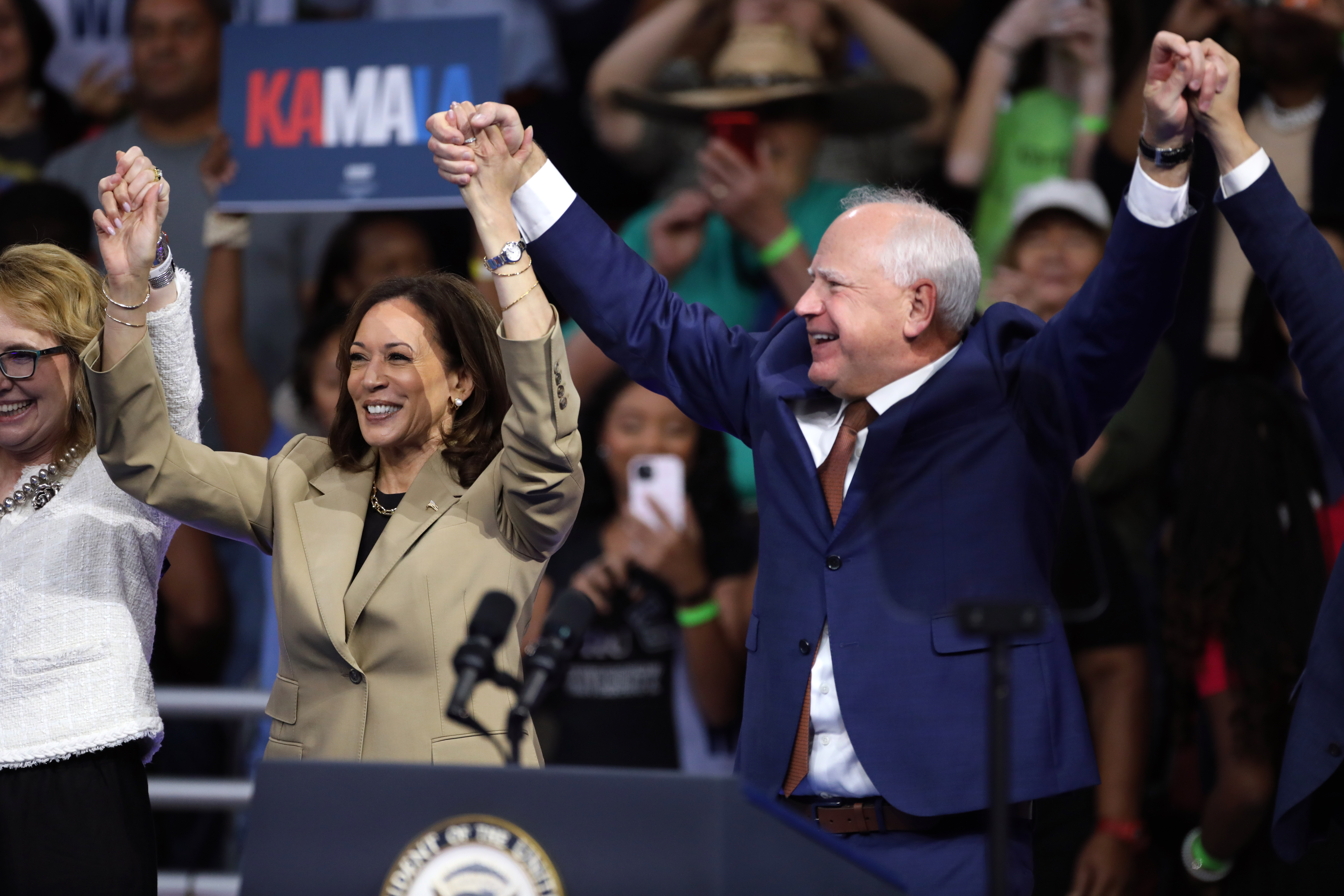
Harris and Tim Walz at a presidential campaign rally at Desert Diamond Arena in Glendale, Arizona, August 2024

The 2024 election with electoral votes by state.

On July 21, 2024, Biden suspended his reelection campaign and immediately endorsed Harris to replace him in his place as the party's presidential nominee. She was also endorsed by Jimmy Carter, Bill and Hillary Clinton, Barack and Michelle Obama, the Congressional Black Caucus, and many others. In the first 24 hours of her candidacy, her campaign raised $81 million in small-dollar donations, the highest single-day total of any presidential candidate in history. Had she won, Harris would have been the first female and first Asian-American president of the United States, and the second African-American president after Obama. Harris is the first nominee who did not participate in the primaries since Vice President Hubert Humphrey in 1968. She also had the shortest general election presidential campaign in history, at 107 days.

By August 5, Harris had officially secured the nomination via a virtual roll call of delegates. The next day, she announced Minnesota governor Tim Walz as her vice-presidential running mate. On August 22, the fourth day of the Democratic National Convention, Harris officially accepted the Democratic nomination for president.

On September 10, 2024, ABC News hosted the presidential debate between Harris and Trump in Philadelphia, Pennsylvania. In the debate, Trump tried to portray Harris as a "radical liberal". Harris's sharpest criticisms of Trump came on abortion rights, where she said she would restore women's rights to what they were under Roe. Harris was declared the winner of the debate by several political analysts, including columnists from CNN, Politico, The New York Times, and USA Today. Some analysts noted that for Harris, this was the "best debate performance of her career," in which she forcefully highlighted her strengths and rattled former president Trump. After the debate, Harris got a prominent celebrity endorsement from Taylor Swift. However, the polls remained close and showed Harris had a hard time conveying that she could represent a "change".

On October 30, Harris delivered a half-hour speech at the Ellipse in Washington, D.C., intended as a "closing argument" for her campaign. Her statements about tax-funded gender-affirming surgery for transgender people in prison were attacked by Trump, who spent millions on a political advertisement that said, "Kamala is for they/them, President Trump is for you." Trump's campaign spent more money on the advertisement than any other in the campaign.

Harris lost the 2024 United States presidential election to Trump, conceding the next day in a speech at her alma mater, Howard University. She lost the electoral college 226 to 312, and the popular vote 48.3% to 49.8%. She became the first Democratic nominee since John Kerry in 2004 to lose the popular vote. (Note: Democratic nominees Barack Obama in 2008 and 2012, Hillary Clinton in 2016, and Joe Biden in 2020 have won the popular vote in four consecutive elections.) Losses in the "blue wall" states of Wisconsin, Michigan, and Pennsylvania were considered key to her defeat, in addition to losing the swing states Nevada, Arizona, Georgia, and North Carolina. Harris's loss was part of a global backlash against incumbent parties in 2024, in part due to the 2021–2023 inflation surge. All 50 states and DC trended rightward compared to the 2020 presidential election. On January 6, 2025, in her role as president of the Senate, Harris oversaw the certification of Trump and Vance as the winners of the election. Had Harris been elected, she would also have been the first sitting vice president to assume the presidency since George H. W. Bush.

== Political positions ==
Harris's domestic platform supports national abortion protections, LGBTQ+ rights, stricter gun control, and limited legislation to address climate change. On immigration, she supports an earned pathway to citizenship and increases in border security, as well as addressing the root causes of illegal immigration by means of the RCS program.

On foreign policy, Harris supports continued military aid to Ukraine and Israel in their respective wars, but insists that Israel should agree to a ceasefire and hostage deal and work toward a two-state solution. She opposes an arms embargo on Israel. Harris has departed from Biden on economic issues, proposing what has been called a "populist" economic agenda.

=== Abortion ===
Harris supports abortion rights, and reproductive health care was central to her presidential campaign. She has been called "the Biden administration's voice for reproductive rights" and "the White House's voice of unflinching support for reproductive health rights." Several abortion rights and women's organizations supported her after Biden withdrew from the race, with Reproductive Freedom for All saying "there is nobody who has fought as hard [as Harris] for abortion rights and access" and EMILY's List calling her "our most powerful advocate and messenger" on reproductive rights.

As of 2020, Harris had a 100% rating from the abortion rights advocacy group Planned Parenthood Action Fund, and a 0% rating from the anti-abortion group National Right to Life Committee. EMILY's List endorsed her in 2015, during her senatorial campaign.

=== LGBT rights ===
As California attorney general, Harris refused to defend Prop 8 in federal court, and after Prop 8 was struck down in Hollingsworth v. Perry in 2013, she ordered the Los Angeles County Clerk's office to "start the marriages immediately". She officiated at the wedding of the plaintiffs in the case, Kris Perry and Sandy Stier, at San Francisco City Hall.

As a member of the U.S. Senate, Harris co-sponsored the Equality Act.

In July 2018, Harris led her colleagues in introducing the Gay and Trans Panic Defense Prohibition Act of 2018, a nationwide bill that would curtail the effectiveness of the so-called gay and trans panic defenses, an issue she pioneered as district attorney of San Francisco.

In October 2019, Harris participated in a CNN/Human Rights Campaign town hall on LGBTQ rights and pledged her support for "all of the folks who are fighting for equality" in cases that would determine whether gay and transgender people are protected under laws banning federal workplace discrimination. Harris drew attention to the epidemic of hate crimes committed against Black trans women (at the time 20 killed that year), noting that LGBTQ people of color are doubly discriminated against.

Harris has since been criticized for a 2015 federal court motion she filed to block gender-affirming medical care for a transgender inmate serving in a California state prison while she was California attorney general, after the Ninth Circuit Court of Appeals had ruled that denying that treatment violated the 8th Amendment's prohibition of cruel and unusual punishment.

=== Criminal justice ===
In December 2018, Harris voted for the First Step Act, legislation aimed at reducing recidivism rates among federal prisoners by expanding job training and other programs, in addition to forming an expansion of early release programs and modifications on sentencing laws such as mandatory minimum sentences for nonviolent drug offenders, "to more equitably punish drug offenders".

In March 2020, Harris was one of 15 senators to sign a letter to the Federal Bureau of Prisons and private prison companies GEO Group, CoreCivic, and Management and Training Corporation requesting information on their strategy to address the COVID-19 pandemic, asserting that it was "critical that [you] have a plan to help prevent the spread of the novel coronavirus to incarcerated individuals and correctional staff, along with their families and loved ones, and provide treatment to incarcerated individuals and staff who become infected."

In June 2020, after a campaign by a coalition of community groups, including Black Lives Matter, Los Angeles Mayor Eric Garcetti announced Los Angeles Police Department budget cuts of $150 million. Harris supported the decision:

In 2020 Harris tweeted in support of donations to the Minnesota Freedom Fund, a bail fund assisting those arrested in the George Floyd protests, though she did not donate to the fund herself.

Harris's criminal justice record has been seen as mixed, with critics calling her "tough on crime" even though she called herself a "progressive prosecutor", citing her reluctance to release prisoners and anti-truancy policies. In her 2009 book, Harris criticized liberals for what she called "biases against law enforcement".

== Public image ==
Though the public had an unfavorable view of Harris as vice president, setting a record low, her public image improved after Biden withdrew his candidacy for reelection. Notably, her approval rating rose 13% among Democrats.

Harris quips, "You think you just fell out of a coconut tree?" during a speech on May 10, 2023.

Harris's term as vice president has seen high staff turnover—including the departures of her chief of staff, deputy chief of staff, press secretary, deputy press secretary, communications director, and chief speechwriter—which critics allege reflects dysfunction and demoralization. Axios reported that at least some of the turnover was due to exhaustion from a demanding transition into the new administration, as well as financial and personal considerations. For most of her tenure, Harris had one of the lowest approval ratings of any vice president. According to a RealClear Politics polling average, a record low of 34.8% of Americans had a favorable view of her in August 2022, but this number rose rapidly after she became the presumptive Democratic presidential nominee in July 2024. Harris had a net favorable rating by September 9.

In 2024, a video clip from 2023 went viral of Harris saying "You think you just fell out of a coconut tree? You exist in the context of all in which you live and what came before you" at a White House event. Since the launch of her 2024 presidential campaign, that and other Harris remarks have been widely shared as memes, resulting in press coverage of her public image.

Harris's often boisterous laughter (Note: In terms of its type, it is often described as a cackle or guffaw. An example of it can be seen in the "coconut tree" video exhibited on the right of this section.) has been called one of her "most defining and most dissected personal traits". She says she got her laugh from her mother.

== Elections during the Harris vice presidency ==
Congressional party leaders
		Senate leaders		House leaders	
Congress	Year	Majority	Minority	Speaker	Minority
117th	2021–2022	Schumer (Note: After two runoff elections, of Democrats Jon Ossoff and Raphael Warnock in Georgia, there were 50 Republicans and 50 Democrats (including 2 independents who caucus with the Democrats) in the Senate. Both Ossoff (Georgia's class 2 seat) and Warnock (Georgia's class 3 seat) were seated on January 20, 2021. With Democratic vice president Kamala Harris casting tie-breaking votes, the Democrats also have held a majority in the Senate from January 20, 2021.)	McConnell	Pelosi	McCarthy
118th	2023	Schumer	McConnell	McCarthy	Jeffries
118th	2023–2024	Schumer	McConnell	Johnson (Note: Kevin McCarthy was removed as Speaker of the House on October 3, 2023. Patrick McHenry acted as Speaker pro tempore from October 3, 2023 to October 25, 2023. Mike Johnson was elected to replace McCarthy as Speaker of the House on October 25, 2023.)	Jeffries
119th (Note: 17 days of the 117th Congress (January 3, 2021 – January 19, 2021) took place under Vice President Pence, with the Republicans also briefly have held a majority in the Senate until January 20, 2021, and 17 days of the 119th Congress (January 3, 2025 – January 19, 2025) took place during Harris' vice presidency.)	2025	Thune	Schumer	Johnson	Jeffries

Democratic seats in Congress (Note: Democratic seats at the start of each session of Congress. Independents caucusing with the Democratic Party (Senators Bernie Sanders, Angus King, Joe Manchin, and Kyrsten Sinema) are counted as Democrats for the purposes of this table. Throughout Biden's presidency, there were a total of 100 Senate seats in 435 House seats, so a Democratic majority in the Senate required 50 seats (since Democratic vice president Kamala Harris could provide the tie-breaking vote), and a Democratic majority in the House required 218 seats (assuming no vacancies).)
Congress	Senate	House
117th	50	222
118th	51	213
119th	47	215

== Post-vice presidency (2025–present) ==
Harris left office on January 20, 2025, succeeded by the 50th vice president of the United States, JD Vance. She and her husband moved to Los Angeles, where they helped distribute food to victims of the Palisades Fire.

On February 18, 2025, Harris signed with Creative Artists Agency (CAA) to focus on speaking and publishing opportunities.

On February 22, 2025, Harris received the Chairman's prize at 56th NAACP Image Awards.

In March 21, 2025, President Trump took away a courtesy normally extended to former vice presidents by revoking Harris's security clearance.

She has been mentioned as a possible candidate for both the 2026 California gubernatorial election as well as the 2028 United States presidential election.

== See also ==
- Presidency of Joe Biden
- US Senate career of Kamala Harris
- Electoral history of Kamala Harris
- Political positions of Kamala Harris
