= Catherine E. Lhamon =

American attorney and former government official (born 1971)

Catherine Lhamon
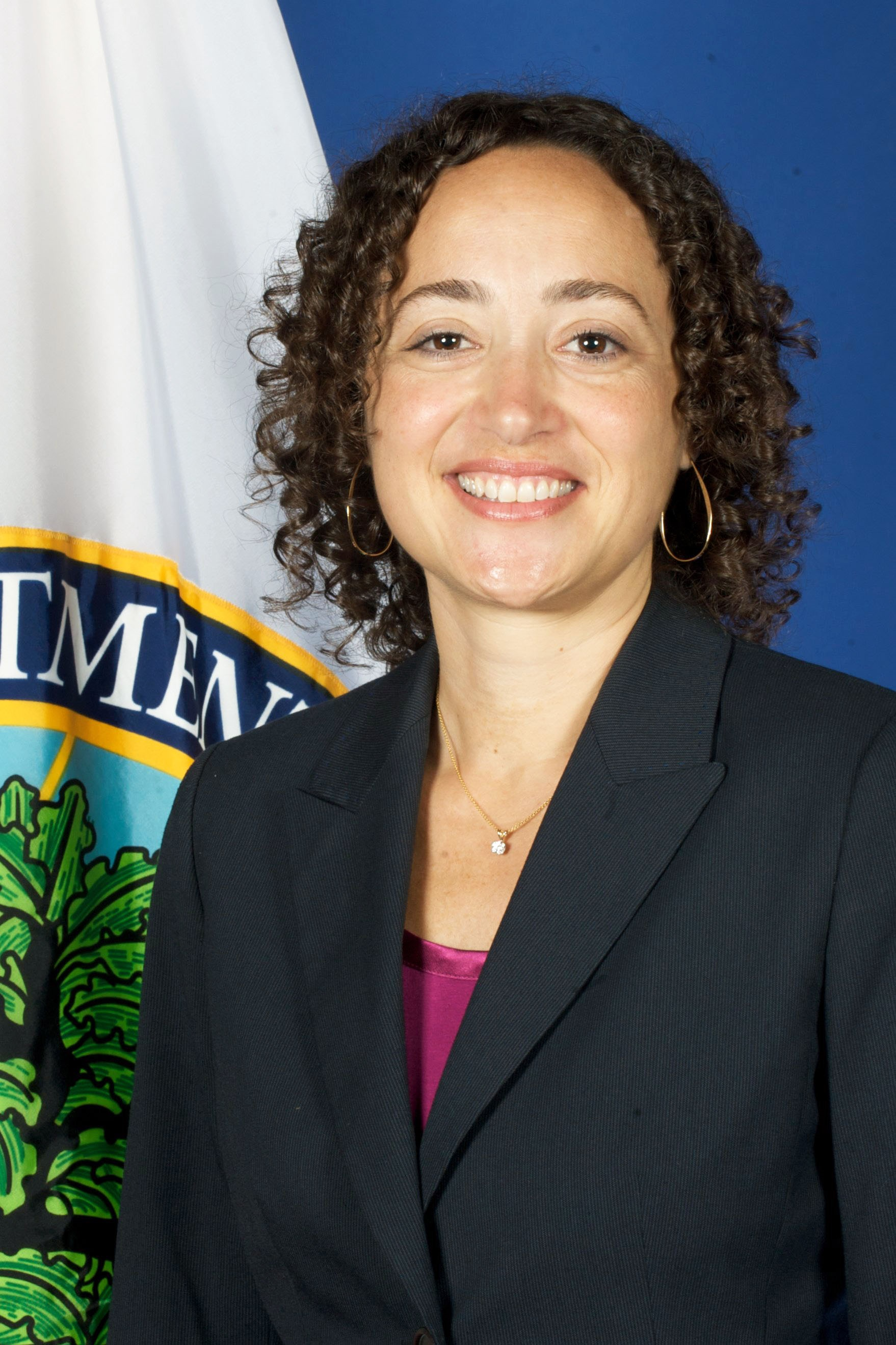

Assistant Secretary of Education for Civil Rights
- In office November 17, 2021 – January 20, 2025
- President: Joe Biden
- Preceded by: Kenneth L. Marcus
- Succeeded by: Kimberly Richey
- In office August 2013 – December 2016
- President: Barack Obama
- Preceded by: Russlynn Ali
- Succeeded by: Kenneth L. Marcus

Deputy Director of the Domestic Policy Council for Racial Justice and Equity
- In office January 20, 2021 – October 25, 2021
- President: Joe Biden
- Preceded by: Position established
- Succeeded by: Chiraag Bains

Chair of the United States Commission on Civil Rights
- In office December 2016 – January 20, 2021
- President: Barack Obama; Donald Trump
- Preceded by: Martin Castro
- Succeeded by: Norma Cantú

Personal details
- Born: August 5, 1971 (age 54) Richmond, Virginia, U.S.
- Party: Democratic
- Children: 2
- Education: Amherst College (BA); Yale University (JD)

Catherine Elizabeth Lhamon (born August 5, 1971) is an American attorney and former government official serving as the executive director of the Edley Center on Law and Democracy at the UC Berkeley School of Law.

Lhamon served as assistant secretary for civil rights at the Department of Education during both the Obama and Biden administrations. During her tenure with the department, she instituted changes to Title IX rules that some feminist and progressive groups praised but conservatives, libertarians, and some liberals and feminists criticized.

Lhamon was deputy chair of the United States Domestic Policy Council for racial justice and equality from January to October 2021 and chaired the United States Commission on Civil Rights from 2016 to 2021.

== Early life and education ==
Lhamon was raised in Palo Alto, California. She earned a Bachelor of Arts from Amherst College and Juris Doctor from Yale Law School.

== Career ==
Lhamon began her career as a law clerk for William Albert Norris of the United States Court of Appeals for the Ninth Circuit, then joined the Appellate Litigation Program at Georgetown University Law Center. For ten years, she was an attorney at the ACLU of Southern California. After that, she was with the pro bono law firm Public Counsel.

In 2013, Lhamon became the assistant secretary for civil rights at the U.S. Department of Education. During her tenure, that office issued "Dear Colleague" letters and other guidelines to school officials, clarifying that a school's failure to appropriately respond to sexual violence or its mistreatment of transgender students can constitute sex discrimination in violation of Title IX, outlining how schools can ensure that student discipline complies with laws prohibiting race discrimination, and explaining how the use of restraint or seclusion can result in unlawful discrimination against students with disabilities. The Title IX guidelines she instituted banned lawyers for the accused from cross-examining witnesses, strongly discouraged the accused from cross-examining witnesses, strongly encouraged schools to allow the complainants not to disclose their identity to the accused, and required schools to use a preponderance of evidence standard (i.e., more likely than not, as opposed to very likely or beyond a reasonable doubt) in evaluating claims. Some feminist organizations praised the new requirements and criticized the Trump Administration's education secretary Betsy DeVos for reversing them. Ms. Magazine hailed "a week of progress for the Obama administration". But the new regulations were criticized by conservatives, libertarians, and some liberals and feminists as violations of the due process rights of the accused. Feminist author Lara Bazelon wrote that the regulations "gave risk-averse schools incentives to expel the accused without any reliable fact-finding process." In 2015, 16 University of Pennsylvania professors signed a letter expressing concern about the regulations' fairness. The regulations were reversed in 2020 by education secretary Betsy DeVos.

In December 2016, Lhamon was appointed chair of the United States Commission on Civil Rights. In 2019, she was appointed California legal affairs secretary by Governor Gavin Newsom. In 2019, Lhamon was mentioned by liberal group Demand Justice as one of their recommended Supreme Court nominees.

On May 13, 2021, President Joe Biden announced his intention to nominate Lhamon for a second term as assistant secretary for civil rights at the Department of Education. The nomination was submitted to the Senate on the same day and referred to the Senate Committee on Health, Education, Labor, and Pensions. The committee deadlocked on an August 3 vote to report the nomination favorably to the Senate. The Senate voted to discharge the nomination from the committee on October 7 by a vote of 50–49. Vice President Kamala Harris cast two tie-breaking votes on October 20 on the Senate's motion to invoke cloture on, as well as to confirm, Lhamon's nomination.

On May 7, 2024, as head of the Office for Civil Rights, Lhamon issued guidance that broadened the Department's definition of alleged antisemitism on college campuses, for the first time giving "hypothetical examples of antisemitism that included acts of criticism or protest against Israel", which the American Association of University Professors identified as contributing to a federal policy of conflating anti-Zionism with discrimination.

In June 2025, Lhamon became the inaugural executive director of the Edley Center on Law and Democracy at the UC Berkeley School of Law. Named in honor of her mentor Christopher Edley Jr., the center's mission is to "defend and strengthen democratic institutions in the United States through actionable research and public leadership."

== Personal life ==
Lhamon is married to Giev Kashkooli, the political and legislative director of the United Farm Workers union. They have two children.
