= Jason Johnson (professor) =

American academic, political pundit

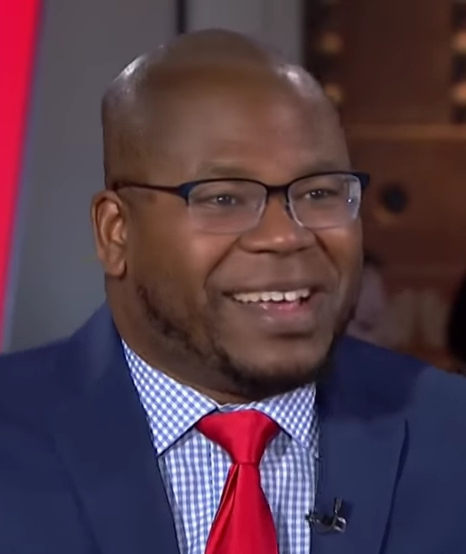
- Johnson in 2018

Academic background
- Education: University of Virginia (BA); University of North Carolina at Chapel Hill (MA, PhD)

Academic work
- Discipline: Political Science; Journalism
- Institutions: Morgan State University; Hiram College

Jason Johnson is an American political scientist, commentator and writer. He is the author of the book Political Consultants and Campaigns: One Day to Sell. Johnson is an associate professor of communication and journalism at Morgan State University. He is a regular political contributor to MS NOW.

== Early life and education ==
Johnson, who is of African American heritage, earned his B.A. in government from the University of Virginia, followed by an M.A. and Ph.D. in political science from the University of North Carolina at Chapel Hill.

== Career ==
Johnson is currently a tenured associate professor in the School of Global Journalism and Communication at Morgan State University in Baltimore, Maryland, where he teaches courses focused on political and international multimedia journalism. Johnson formerly was a professor of political science and communications at Hiram College in Hiram, Ohio, where he taught American politics, comparative politics, campaign management and communications. In October 2010, Johnson was named the politics editor for The Source. He also served as politics editor of The Root until early 2020.

Johnson is the author of Political Consultants and Campaigns: One Day to Sell.

Johnson served as campaign manager on legislative races in Virginia, South Carolina and Maryland. In the field of international and comparative politics, Johnson worked on the 2000 London mayoral election, and as an international election monitor in Mexico and South Africa.

Johnson has been quoted on politics by The Wall Street Journal, The Hill, The Cincinnati Enquirer, Akron Beacon Journal, and The Plain Dealer. He has also appeared in the online edition of Essence and Black Enterprise.

Johnson is a frequent television commentator locally, nationally and internationally. He is a regular commentator on MSNBC, Al Jazeera English and has appeared on Fox News Channel's The O'Reilly Factor. While teaching at Hiram College, Johnson was a regular political commentator on WKYC and WOIO in Cleveland, WKBN-TV, and WYTV in Youngstown.

Johnson has been interviewed for NPR's Morning Edition and All Things Considered. From February 2021 to December 2024, Johnson was host of the Slate (magazine) podcast "A Word ... with Jason Johnson," which was described as "tough, smart, and surprising conversations about race in American politics and society," and featuring interviews with newsmakers such as Yvette Nicole Brown, Ta-Nehisi Coates, and Doug Emhoff.

Johnson is a paid contributor on MSNBC. He was temporarily "benched" in February 2020 after referring to female African American supporters of 2020 Democratic presidential candidate Bernie Sanders as being from "the Island of Misfit Black Girls". Johnson returned to MSNBC in July 2020 and remains a regular political panelist.
