= 107 Days =

2025 book by Kamala Harris

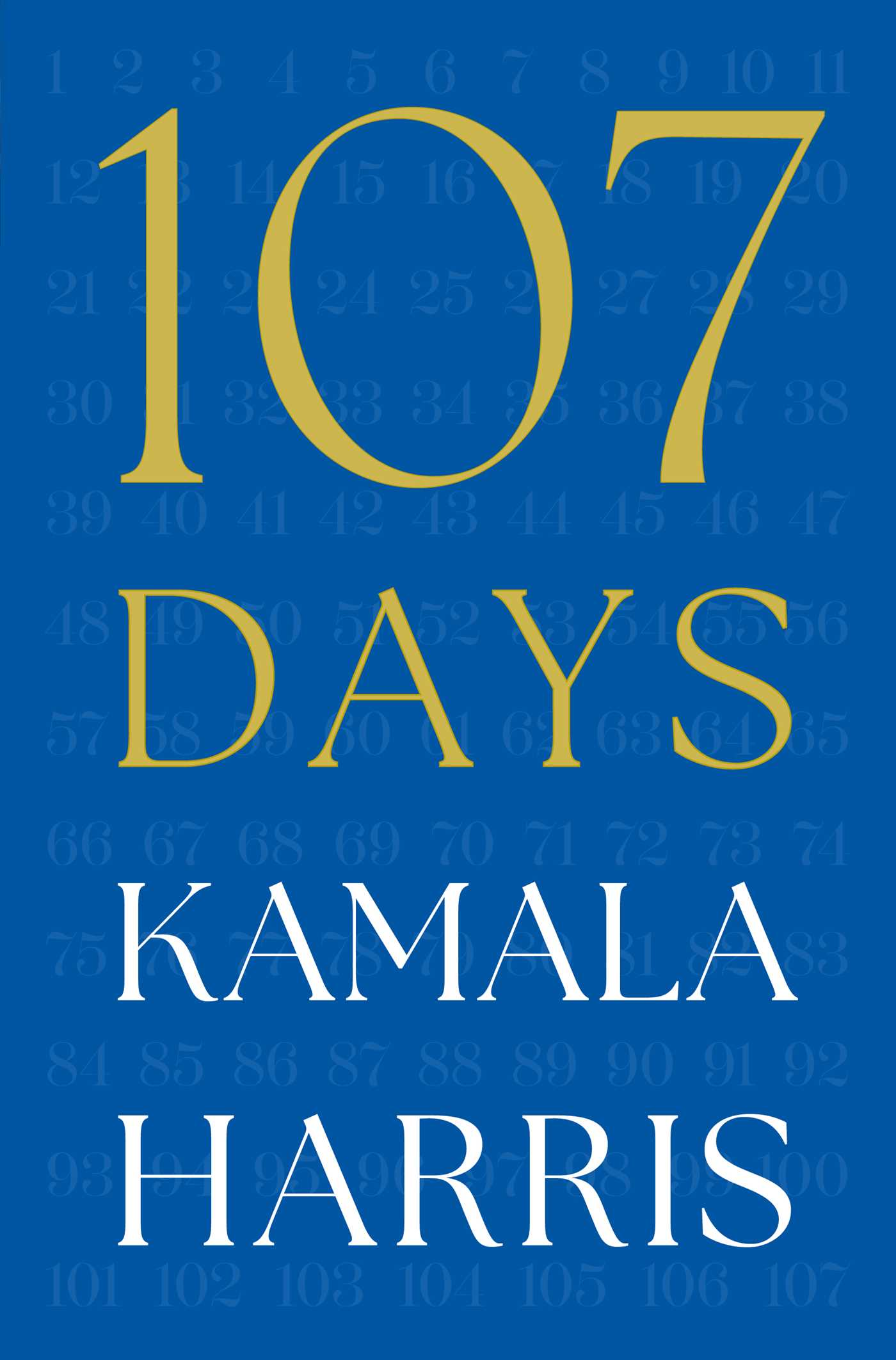
- Author: Kamala Harris
- Language: English
- Subject: Kamala Harris 2024 presidential campaign
- Genre: Political memoir
- Publisher: Simon & Schuster
- Publication date: September 23, 2025
- Pages: 320
- ISBN: 978-1668211656
- Website: Official website

107 Days is a political memoir by Kamala Harris, the 49th vice president of the United States, in collaboration with author Geraldine Brooks. The book details Harris's 2024 presidential campaign spanning from Joe Biden's withdrawal from the election on July 21, 2024, to Election Day on November 5, with the title referencing the length of her campaign. It was released by Simon & Schuster on September 23, 2025, in hardcover, ebook and a ten-hour audiobook edition read by Harris.

The book sold 350,000 copies in the United States in its first week, and had an initial printing of 500,000 copies. Simon & Schuster CEO Jonathan Karp said the book was one of the best-selling memoirs in the 2020s. The book was on The New York Times Best Seller list for Hardcover Nonfiction for 15 consecutive weeks.

== Development and publication ==
On July 31, 2025, Simon & Schuster announced that Harris would publish a memoir about her 2024 presidential campaign, with a release date of September 23. In a video posted on social media, Harris stated that the memoir was derived from a journal in which she wrote her reflections and recollections of "the shortest presidential campaign in modern history". Harris collaborated with Geraldine Brooks to give the book a "novelistic feel", and Simon & Schuster CEO Jonathan Karp stated that the book reads more like a suspense novel than a political memoir. The memoir was coedited by Jonathan Karp and Dawn Davis, the senior vice president of Simon & Schuster. An audiobook version of the memoir narrated by Harris was announced to be published on Audible.

On August 21, 2025, Harris announced on social media that she would be starting an international book tour in September 2025 to promote 107 Days. She scheduled eighteen appearances in cities across the United States, Canada, and the United Kingdom; the first leg lasted through November 2025. In December 2025, Harris announced a second leg of the tour beginning in New Orleans on January 13, 2026, and finishing in Anaheim in April 2026.

== Contents ==
In the book, Harris calls leaving the decision to run for re-election solely up to Joe and Jill Biden "reckless". Harris acknowledges Biden's age and health concerns, but says that Biden was still capable of functioning as president. Nonetheless, Harris states that she was "angry and disappointed" with Biden for his poor 2024 debate performance with then-former president Donald Trump, particularly because he did not understand how bad his performance was. In contrast to Biden, Harris did have a more well-received debate performance with Trump. Harris described her preparations for the debate in the book, which were led by Karen Dunn.

Harris compared her loss, in which she lost the popular vote by 1.5% (48.3–49.8%) and the Electoral College 226–312, to the 2008 Super Bowl. She lost Wisconsin by 0.9%, Michigan by 1.4%, Pennsylvania by 1.7%, and Georgia by 2.2%. (Note: Had Harris won Wisconsin, Michigan, and Pennsylvania, she would have won exactly 270 out of 538 electoral votes to win. Had she also won Georgia, she would have won 286 electoral votes.) She quoted Tom Brady, who similarly described being surprised and devastated by his loss when the New England Patriots lost to the New York Giants 14–17.

Harris does not say whether she will run for political office in the future in the book. She declined to run for Governor of California in the 2026 California gubernatorial election. Harris has expressed potential interest in running again for president in the 2028 United States presidential election.

== Reception ==
107 Days has been a commercial success, but some have been critical of the content.

The book was positively reviewed by Jennifer Szalai of The New York Times, though Szalai acknowledged Harris's perspective was biased given she was defending her own record. The Guardian gave the book a largely negative review, largely due to its negative tone and inability to provide the reader with closure. It did not, however, criticize the book's writing quality. Democratic strategist Michael Hardaway criticized the book calling it "unhelpful" and saying it was "essentially a bunch of finger pointing and blaming others". Prior to its release, Stephen A. Smith questioned the point of the book, saying, "Who cares what [Kamala Harris] has to say? ... There's nothing to elaborate about."

More than 15 Democratic operatives across the country who were interviewed about their thoughts on the book criticized it, with one saying "If there's a political strategy here, it's a bad one. There's an awful lot of grievances and finger-pointing that really doesn't serve a political agenda," and another saying "This reads like, good-riddance to politics." Writing for The Guardian, Nesrine Malik criticized Harris's campaign for a lack of self-reflection and says that she along with other Democrats were delusional.

Billy Binion writing for Reason magazine said that Harris demonstrates her role as, "...ever the prosecutor" in the book for her comments in the book which derided Ross Ulbricht as merely a "fentanyl dealer", when in fact Ulbricht had never been charged with the dealing of or accused of selling fentanyl on the Silk Road site which he had created and operated from 2011 through its closure in 2013.

== See also ==
- 2024 United States presidential election
- Public image of Kamala Harris
- Other books by Kamala Harris:
  - Smart on Crime
  - Superheroes Are Everywhere
  - The Truths We Hold
