= 2014 California Attorney General election =

- November 4, 2014
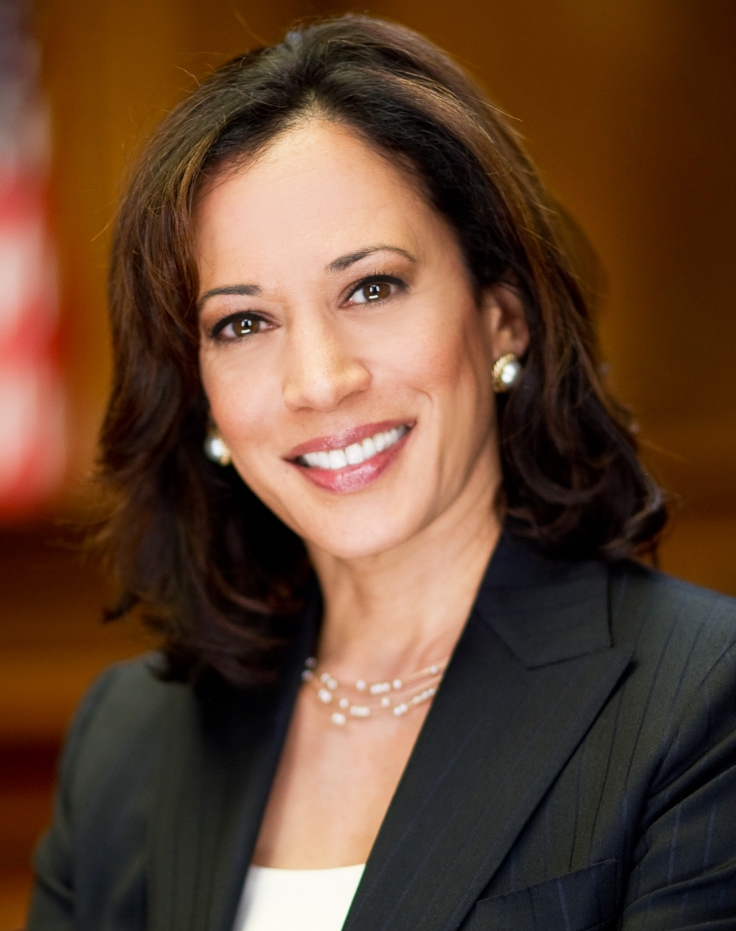

Nominee	Kamala Harris	Ronald Gold
Party	Democratic	Republican
Popular vote	4,102,649	3,033,476
Percentage	57.49%	42.51%
- County results Harris: 50–60% 60–70% 70–80% 80–90% Gold: 50–60% 60–70% 70–80%
Attorney General before election
Kamala Harris
Democratic
Elected Attorney General
Kamala Harris
Democratic

The 2014 California attorney general election was held on November 4, 2014, to elect the attorney general of California. Incumbent Democratic attorney general Kamala Harris won re-election to a second term in office.

A primary election was held on June 3, 2014. Under California's nonpartisan blanket primary law, all candidates appear on the same ballot, regardless of party. In the primary, voters may vote for any candidate, regardless of their party affiliation. The top two finishers — regardless of party — advance to the general election in November, even if a candidate manages to receive a majority of the votes cast in the primary election. Harris and Republican Ronald Gold finished first and second, respectively, and contested the general election, which Harris won by a margin of 14.98%. As of 2025, this election, alongside other concurrent statewide races, marks the last time where Mono and San Diego counties voted for the Republican in a statewide race.

== Primary election ==
=== Candidates ===
==== Democratic Party ====
- Kamala Harris, incumbent attorney general

==== Republican Party ====
- Ronald Gold, former deputy attorney general
- John Haggerty
- David King
- Phil Wyman, former state assemblyman and former state senator

==== Libertarian Party ====
- Jonathan Jaech

==== No party preference ====
- Orly Taitz, "birther" activist, candidate for secretary of state of California in 2010 and for the U.S. Senate in 2012

=== Results ===
Nonpartisan blanket primary
Party	Candidate	Votes	%
Democratic	Kamala Harris (incumbent)	2,177,480	53.2
Republican	Ronald Gold	504,091	12.3
Republican	Phil Wyman	479,468	11.7
Republican	David King	368,190	9.0
Republican	John Haggerty	336,433	8.2
No party preference	Orly Taitz	130,451	3.2
Libertarian	Jonathan Jaech	99,056	2.4
Total votes		4,095,169	100.0

== General election ==
=== Polling ===
Poll source	Date(s) administered	Sample size	Margin of error	Kamala Harris (D)	Ronald Gold (R)	Undecided
GQR/American Viewpoint	October 22–29, 2014	1,162	± 3.3%	51%	37%	12%
Field Poll	October 15–28, 2014	941	± 3.4%	49%	36%	15%
Field Poll	August 14–28, 2014	467	± 4.8%	49%	37%	14%

=== Results ===
2014 California Attorney General election
Party	Candidate	Votes	%	±%
Democratic	Kamala Harris (incumbent)	4,102,649	57.49%	+11.44%
Republican	Ronald Gold	3,033,476	42.51%	−2.77%
Total votes		7,136,125	100.00%	N/A
Democratic hold				

==== By county ====
County	Kamala Harris Democratic		Ronald Gold Republican		Margin		Total votes cast
County	#	%	#	%	#	%	Total votes cast
Alameda	272,218	78.21%	75,835	21.79%	196,383	56.42%	348,053
Alpine	260	56.77%	198	43.23%	62	13.54%	458
Amador	5,050	40.63%	7,378	59.37%	-2,328	-18.73%	12,428
Butte	26,622	44.87%	32,716	55.13%	-6,094	-10.27%	59,338
Calaveras	6,162	40.60%	9,017	59.40%	-2,855	-18.81%	15,179
Colusa	1,454	35.81%	2,606	64.19%	-1,152	-28.37%	4,060
Contra Costa	160,718	64.34%	89,065	35.66%	71,653	28.69%	249,783
Del Norte	3,034	44.76%	3,744	55.24%	-710	-10.48%	6,778
El Dorado	24,352	40.83%	35,286	59.17%	-10,934	-18.33%	59,638
Fresno	72,947	46.67%	83,344	53.33%	-10,397	-6.65%	156,291
Glenn	1,765	30.27%	4,066	69.73%	-2,301	-39.46%	5,831
Humboldt	22,497	62.33%	13,595	37.67%	8,902	24.66%	36,092
Imperial	12,097	58.86%	8,454	41.14%	3,643	17.73%	20,551
Inyo	2,280	42.66%	3,065	57.34%	-785	-14.69%	5,345
Kern	49,805	37.66%	82,434	62.34%	-32,629	-24.67%	132,239
Kings	8,395	38.24%	13,559	61.76%	-5,164	-23.52%	21,954
Lake	9,777	57.21%	7,313	42.79%	2,464	14.42%	17,090
Lassen	1,922	28.52%	4,817	71.48%	-2,895	-42.96%	6,739
Los Angeles	957,238	66.94%	472,744	33.06%	484,494	33.88%	1,429,982
Madera	9,766	37.03%	16,610	62.97%	-6,844	-25.95%	26,376
Marin	63,698	74.74%	21,523	25.26%	42,175	49.49%	85,221
Mariposa	2,491	38.79%	3,930	61.21%	-1,439	-22.41%	6,421
Mendocino	16,128	68.19%	7,524	31.81%	8,604	36.38%	23,652
Merced	17,431	47.25%	19,460	52.75%	-2,029	-5.50%	36,891
Modoc	772	27.66%	2,019	72.34%	-1,247	-44.68%	2,791
Mono	1,494	49.63%	1,516	50.37%	-22	-0.73%	3,010
Monterey	46,983	65.02%	25,272	34.98%	21,711	30.05%	72,255
Napa	22,916	61.79%	14,172	38.21%	8,744	23.58%	37,088
Nevada	18,949	50.86%	18,311	49.14%	638	1.71%	37,260
Orange	258,546	42.56%	348,890	57.44%	-90,344	-14.87%	607,436
Placer	44,522	40.38%	65,742	59.62%	-21,220	-19.24%	110,264
Plumas	2,777	40.16%	4,137	59.84%	-1,360	-19.67%	6,914
Riverside	160,910	46.65%	184,007	53.35%	-23,097	-6.70%	344,917
Sacramento	183,517	58.02%	132,775	41.98%	50,742	16.04%	316,292
San Benito	7,867	59.07%	5,451	40.93%	2,416	18.14%	13,318
San Bernardino	135,916	48.11%	146,613	51.89%	-10,697	-3.79%	282,529
San Diego	315,462	48.44%	335,780	51.56%	-20,318	-3.12%	651,242
San Francisco	180,253	83.79%	34,870	16.21%	145,383	67.58%	215,123
San Joaquin	57,701	50.62%	56,281	49.38%	1,420	1.25%	113,982
San Luis Obispo	41,789	50.23%	41,403	49.77%	386	0.46%	83,192
San Mateo	109,207	69.79%	47,262	30.21%	61,945	39.59%	156,469
Santa Barbara	60,052	55.90%	47,383	44.10%	12,669	11.79%	107,435
Santa Clara	257,169	67.17%	125,667	32.83%	131,502	34.35%	382,836
Santa Cruz	53,396	75.60%	17,238	24.40%	36,158	51.19%	70,634
Shasta	18,995	34.38%	36,259	65.62%	-17,264	-31.24%	55,254
Sierra	603	40.63%	881	59.37%	-278	-18.73%	1,484
Siskiyou	5,612	41.77%	7,824	58.23%	-2,212	-16.46%	13,436
Solano	52,596	59.84%	35,298	40.16%	17,298	19.68%	87,894
Sonoma	97,891	70.02%	41,904	29.98%	55,987	40.05%	139,795
Stanislaus	40,989	46.28%	47,574	53.72%	-6,585	-7.44%	88,563
Sutter	7,439	37.25%	12,534	62.75%	-5,095	-25.51%	19,973
Tehama	4,969	32.72%	10,218	67.28%	-5,249	-34.56%	15,187
Trinity	1,746	45.72%	2,073	54.28%	-327	-8.56%	3,819
Tulare	22,066	36.23%	38,834	63.77%	-16,768	-27.53%	60,900
Tuolumne	6,776	40.82%	9,825	59.18%	-3,049	-18.37%	16,601
Ventura	101,225	51.80%	94,198	48.20%	7,027	3.60%	195,423
Yolo	28,917	65.50%	15,234	34.50%	13,683	30.99%	44,151
Yuba	4,520	36.84%	7,748	63.16%	-3,228	-26.31%	12,268
Total	4,102,649	57.49%	3,033,476	42.51%	1,069,173	14.98%	7,136,125
