= Kamala Harris =

Vice President of the United States from 2021 to 2025

- Official portrait, 2021

49th Vice President of the United States
- In office January 20, 2021 – January 20, 2025
- President: Joe Biden
- Preceded by: Mike Pence
- Succeeded by: JD Vance

United States Senator from California
- In office January 3, 2017 – January 18, 2021
- Preceded by: Barbara Boxer
- Succeeded by: Alex Padilla

32nd Attorney General of California
- In office January 3, 2011 – January 3, 2017
- Governor: Jerry Brown
- Preceded by: Jerry Brown
- Succeeded by: Xavier Becerra

27th District Attorney of San Francisco
- In office January 8, 2004 – January 3, 2011
- Preceded by: Terence Hallinan
- Succeeded by: George Gascón

Personal details
- Born: Kamala Devi Harris (Note: Harris was originally named Kamala Iyer Harris by her parents, who two weeks later filed an affidavit by which her middle name was changed to Devi.); October 20, 1964 (age 62) Oakland, California, U.S.
- Party: Democratic
- Spouse: Doug Emhoff (m. 2014)
- Parents: Donald J. Harris; Shyamala Gopalan Harris
- Relatives: Harris family
- Education: Howard University (BA); University of California, Hastings (JD)
- Website: Official website
- Harris's voice Harris on the Americans with Disabilities Act; Recorded July 26, 2021

Kamala Devi Harris (/ˈkɑːmələ ˈdeɪvi/ KAH-mə-lə DAY-vee; born October 20, 1964) is an American politician and attorney who served as the 49th vice president of the United States from 2021 to 2025 under President Joe Biden. A member of the Democratic Party, she was the party's nominee in the 2024 presidential election. Of Indian and Jamaican parentage, she is the first female, first African American, and first Asian American vice president, and the highest-ranking female and Asian public official in U.S. history. Harris represented California in the United States Senate from 2017 to 2021 and was the attorney general of California from 2011 to 2017.

Born in Oakland, California, Harris graduated from Howard University and the University of California, Hastings College of the Law. She began her law career in the office of the district attorney of Alameda County. Harris was recruited to the San Francisco District Attorney's Office and later to the office of the city attorney of San Francisco. She was elected district attorney of San Francisco in 2003 and attorney general of California in 2010, and reelected as attorney general in 2014. Harris was the junior U.S. senator from California from 2017 to 2021 after winning the 2016 Senate election. She was the second Black female and first South Asian American U.S. senator.

As a senator, Harris advocated for stricter gun control laws, the DREAM Act, federal legalization of cannabis, and reforms to healthcare and taxation. She gained a national profile while asking pointed questions of officials from Donald Trump's first administration during Senate hearings, including Trump's second U.S. Supreme Court nominee, Brett Kavanaugh. Harris sought the 2020 Democratic presidential nomination in 2019, but withdrew from the race before the primaries. Biden selected her as his running mate; their ticket defeated the incumbent president and vice president, Trump and Mike Pence, in the 2020 presidential election.

When her vice presidency began, Harris presided over an evenly split U.S. Senate. She cast 33 tie-breaking votes, more than any other vice president, including votes to pass the American Rescue Plan Act of 2021 and the Inflation Reduction Act. In July 2024, after Biden withdrew his candidacy from the 2024 presidential election, Harris quickly launched her own presidential campaign with his immediate endorsement. She later became the nominee and selected Minnesota governor Tim Walz as her running mate. They lost the election to the Republican nominees, former president Trump and Ohio senator JD Vance. It has been speculated that Harris will run in the 2028 United States presidential election.

== Early life and career ==
=== Early life and education ===
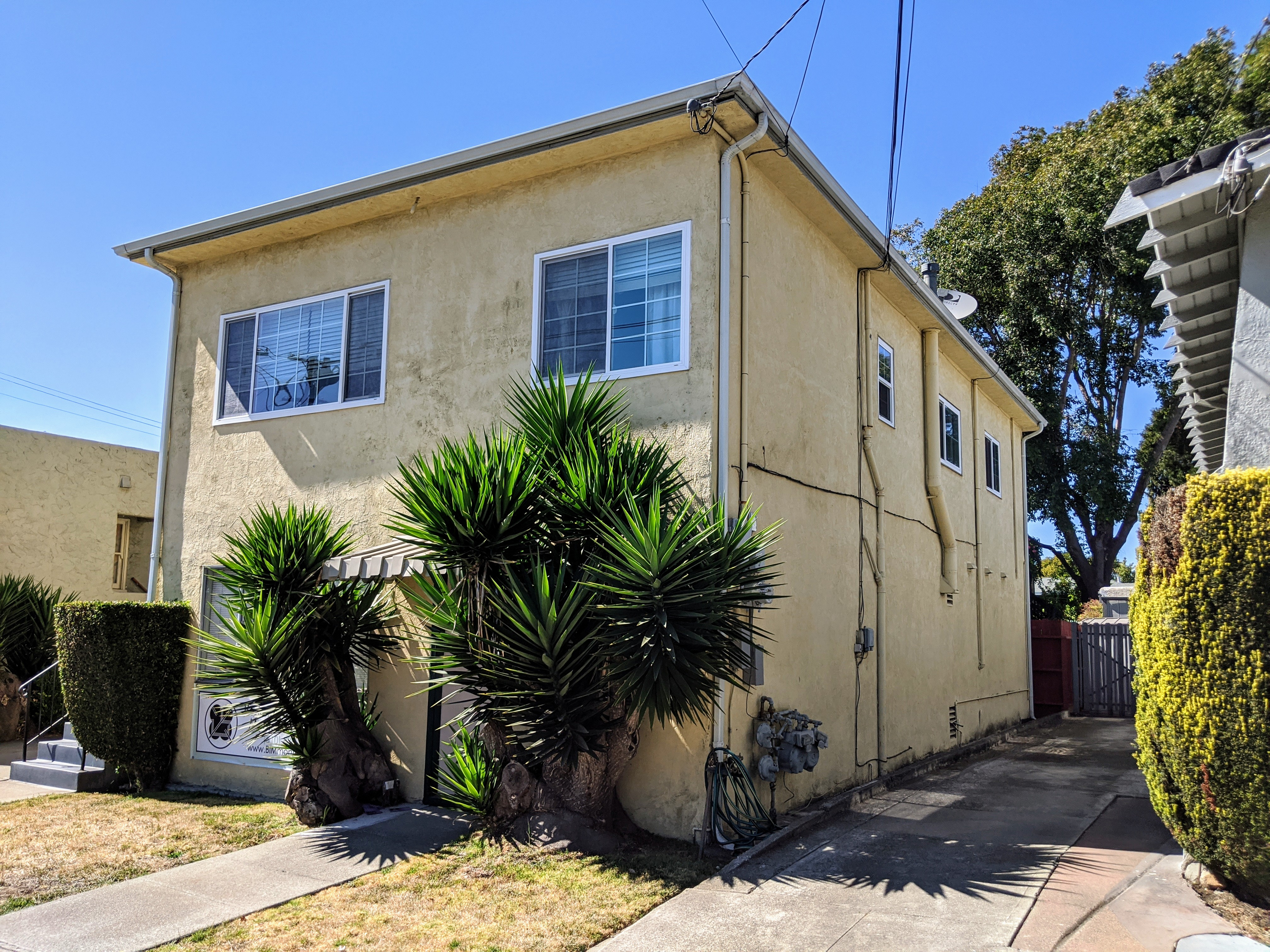
Harris's childhood home at 1227 Bancroft Way in Berkeley, as seen in August 2020

Kamala Devi Harris was born in Oakland, California, on October 20, 1964. Her mother, Shyamala Gopalan Harris, was a Tamil Brahmin Iyengar biomedical scientist and researcher who arrived in the United States from India in 1958 to enroll in graduate school in endocrinology at the University of California, Berkeley. A research career of over 40 years followed, during which her work on the progesterone receptor gene led to advances in breast cancer research. Kamala's father, Donald J. Harris, is an Afro-Jamaican who immigrated to the US in 1961 and also enrolled at UC Berkeley, specializing in development economics. The first Black scholar to be granted tenure in Stanford University's economics department, he has emeritus status there. Kamala's parents met in 1962 and married in 1963.

The Harris family lived in Berkeley until they moved in 1966, around Kamala's second birthday. The Harrises lived for a few years in college towns in the Midwest where her parents held teaching or research positions: Urbana, Illinois (where her sister Maya was born in 1966); Evanston, Illinois; and Madison, Wisconsin. (Note: The schools were University of Illinois, Urbana-Champaign; Northwestern University, Evanston; and University of Wisconsin, Madison.) By 1970, the marriage had faltered, and Shyamala moved back to Berkeley with her two daughters; the couple divorced when Kamala was seven.

During the early 1970s, Harris often went with her mother to Chennai, India, where they stayed with her maternal grandfather. She learned to wear traditional Indian dress and speak a few phrases of the Tamil language.

In 1972, Donald Harris accepted a position at Stanford University; Kamala and Maya spent weekends at his house in Palo Alto and lived at their mother's house in Berkeley during the week. Shyamala was friends with African-American intellectuals and activists in Oakland and Berkeley. In 1976, she accepted a research position at the McGill University School of Medicine, and moved with her daughters to Montreal, Quebec. Kamala graduated from Westmount High School on Montreal Island in 1981.

Kamala Harris attended Vanier College in Montreal in 1981–1982; she then attended Howard University, a historically black university in Washington, D.C. At Howard, she became a member of Alpha Kappa Alpha, one of the "Divine Nine" historically black sororities. She graduated in 1986 with a degree in political science and economics. Harris then attended the University of California, Hastings College of the Law in San Francisco, where she served as president of its chapter of the Black Law Students Association. She graduated with a Juris Doctor in 1989.

=== Early career ===
In 1990, Harris was hired as a deputy district attorney in Alameda County, California, where she was described as "an able prosecutor on the way up". In 1994, Speaker of the California Assembly Willie Brown, who was then dating Harris, appointed her to the state Unemployment Insurance Appeals Board and later to the California Medical Assistance Commission. In February 1998, San Francisco district attorney Terence Hallinan recruited Harris as an assistant district attorney. There, she became the chief of the Career Criminal Division, supervising five other attorneys, where she prosecuted homicide, burglary, robbery, and sexual assault cases—particularly three-strikes cases. In August 2000, Harris took a job at San Francisco City Hall, working for city attorney Louise Renne. Harris ran the Family and Children's Services Division, representing child abuse and neglect cases. Renne endorsed Harris during her D.A. campaign.

=== San Francisco district attorney (2002–2011) ===
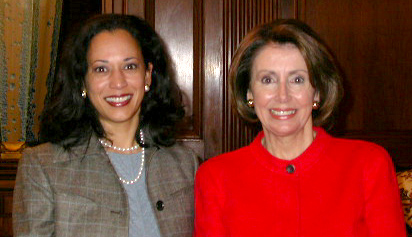
Harris with future House Speaker Nancy Pelosi in March 2004

In 2002, Harris ran for district attorney of San Francisco, running a "forceful" campaign and differentiating herself from Hallinan by attacking his performance. Harris won the election with 56% of the vote, becoming the first person of color elected district attorney of San Francisco. She ran unopposed for a second term in 2007.

Within the first six months of taking office, Harris cleared 27 of 74 backlogged homicide cases. She also pushed for higher bail for criminal defendants involved in gun-related crimes, arguing that historically low bail encouraged outsiders to commit crimes in San Francisco. SFPD officers credited Harris with tightening the loopholes defendants had used in the past. During her campaign, Harris pledged never to seek the death penalty, and kept to this in the cases of a San Francisco Police Department officer, Isaac Espinoza, who was shot and killed in 2004, and of Edwin Ramos, an illegal immigrant and alleged MS-13 gang member who was accused of murdering a man and his two sons in 2009.

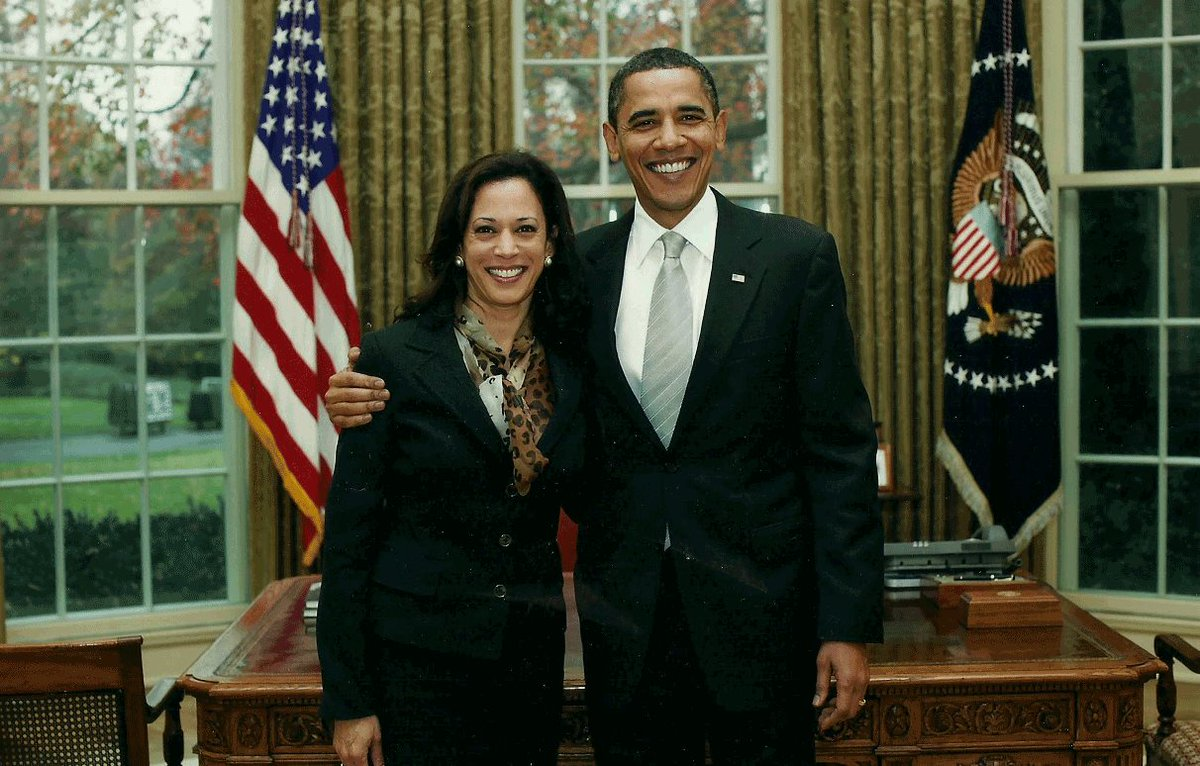
Harris with President Barack Obama in the Oval Office, November 2009

Harris created a Hate Crimes Unit, focusing on hate crimes against LGBT children and teens in schools, and supported A.B. 1160, the "Gwen Araujo Justice for Victims Act". As district attorney, she created an environmental crimes unit in 2005. Harris expressed support for San Francisco's sanctuary city policy of not inquiring about immigration status in the process of a criminal investigation. In 2004, she created the San Francisco Reentry Division. Over six years, the 200 people graduated from the program had a recidivism rate of less than 10%, compared to the 53% of California's drug offenders who returned to prison within two years of release.

In 2006, as part of an initiative to reduce the city's homicide rate, Harris led a citywide effort to combat truancy for at-risk elementary school youth in San Francisco. In 2008, declaring chronic truancy a matter of public safety and pointing out that the majority of prison inmates and homicide victims are dropouts or habitual truants, she issued citations against six parents whose children missed at least 50 days of school, the first time San Francisco prosecuted adults for student truancy. Harris's office ultimately prosecuted seven parents in three years, with none jailed. By April 2009, 1,330 elementary school students were habitual or chronic truants, down 23% from 1,730 in 2008, and from 2,517 in 2007 and 2,856 in 2006.

== Attorney general of California (2011–2017) ==
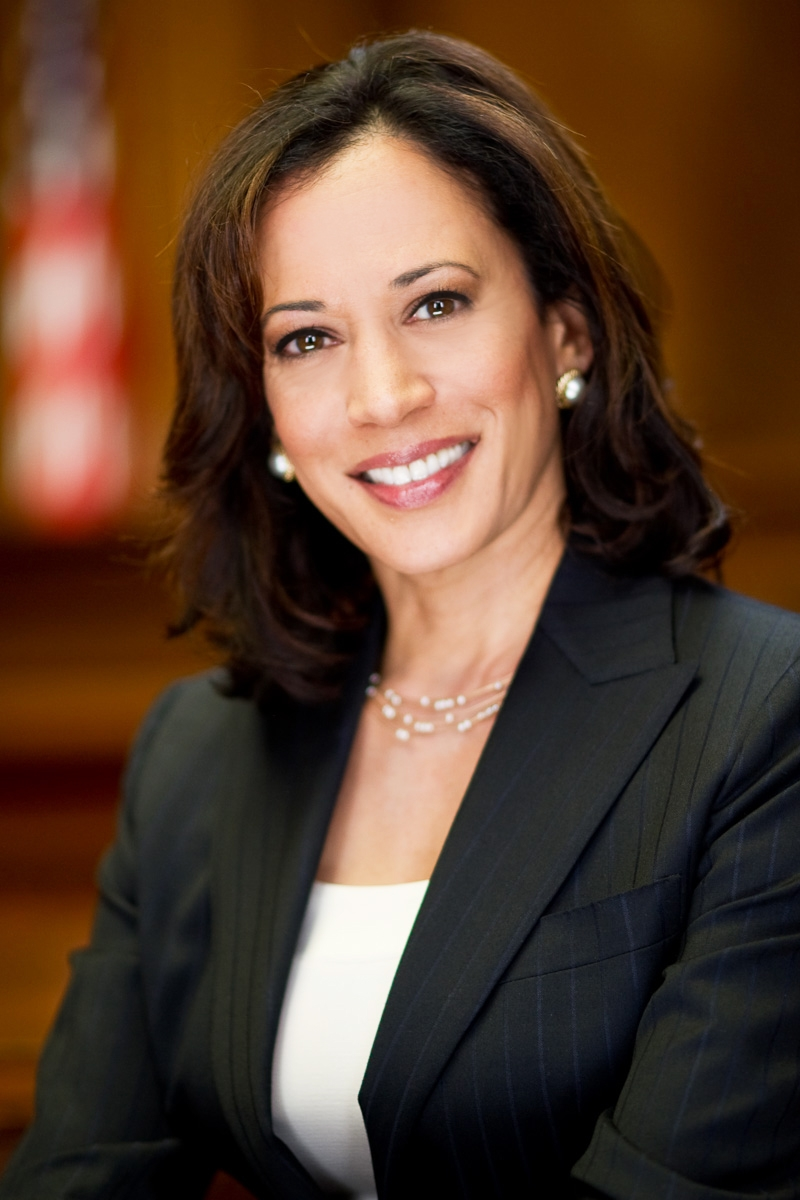
Harris's official attorney general portrait, 2010

Harris was elected attorney general of California in 2010, becoming the first woman, African American, and South Asian American to hold the office in the state's history. She took office on January 3, 2011, and was reelected in 2014. She served until resigning on January 3, 2017, to take her seat in the United States Senate.

In 2010, Harris announced her candidacy for attorney general and was endorsed by prominent California Democrats, including U.S. senators Dianne Feinstein and Barbara Boxer and House speaker Nancy Pelosi. She won the Democratic primary and narrowly defeated Republican nominee Steve Cooley in the general election. Her tenure was marked by significant efforts in consumer protection, criminal justice reform, and privacy rights.

In 2014, Harris was reelected, defeating Republican nominee Ronald Gold with 58% of the vote. Her future opponent in the 2024 United States presidential election, Donald Trump, made two contributions to her reelection campaign totaling $6,000. In 2015, she donated Trump's contributions to a "nonprofit that advocates for civil and human rights for Central Americans." (Note: Trump's daughter Ivanka also contributed $2,000 to Harris's reelection campaign, but no mention was made of whether Ivanka's contribution was also donated to a nonprofit organization.)

During her second term, Harris expanded her focus on consumer protection, recovering billions for California consumers by securing major settlements against corporations like Quest Diagnostics, JPMorgan Chase, and Corinthian Colleges. She spearheaded the creation of the Homeowner Bill of Rights to combat aggressive foreclosure practices during the housing crisis, recording multiple nine-figure settlements against mortgage servicers. Harris also worked on privacy rights. She collaborated with major tech companies like Apple, Google, and Facebook to ensure that mobile apps disclosed their data-sharing practices. She created the Privacy Enforcement and Protection Unit, focusing on cyber privacy and data breaches. California secured settlements with companies like Comcast and Houzz for privacy violations.

Harris was instrumental in advancing criminal justice reform. She launched the Division of Recidivism Reduction and Re-Entry and implemented the Back on Track LA program, which provided educational and job training opportunities for nonviolent offenders. Despite her focus on reform, Harris faced criticism for defending the state's position in cases involving wrongful convictions and for her office's stance on prison labor. She continued to advocate for progressive reforms, including banning the gay panic defense in California courts and opposing Proposition 8, the state's same-sex marriage ban.

== U.S. senator (2017–2021) ==
=== Election ===
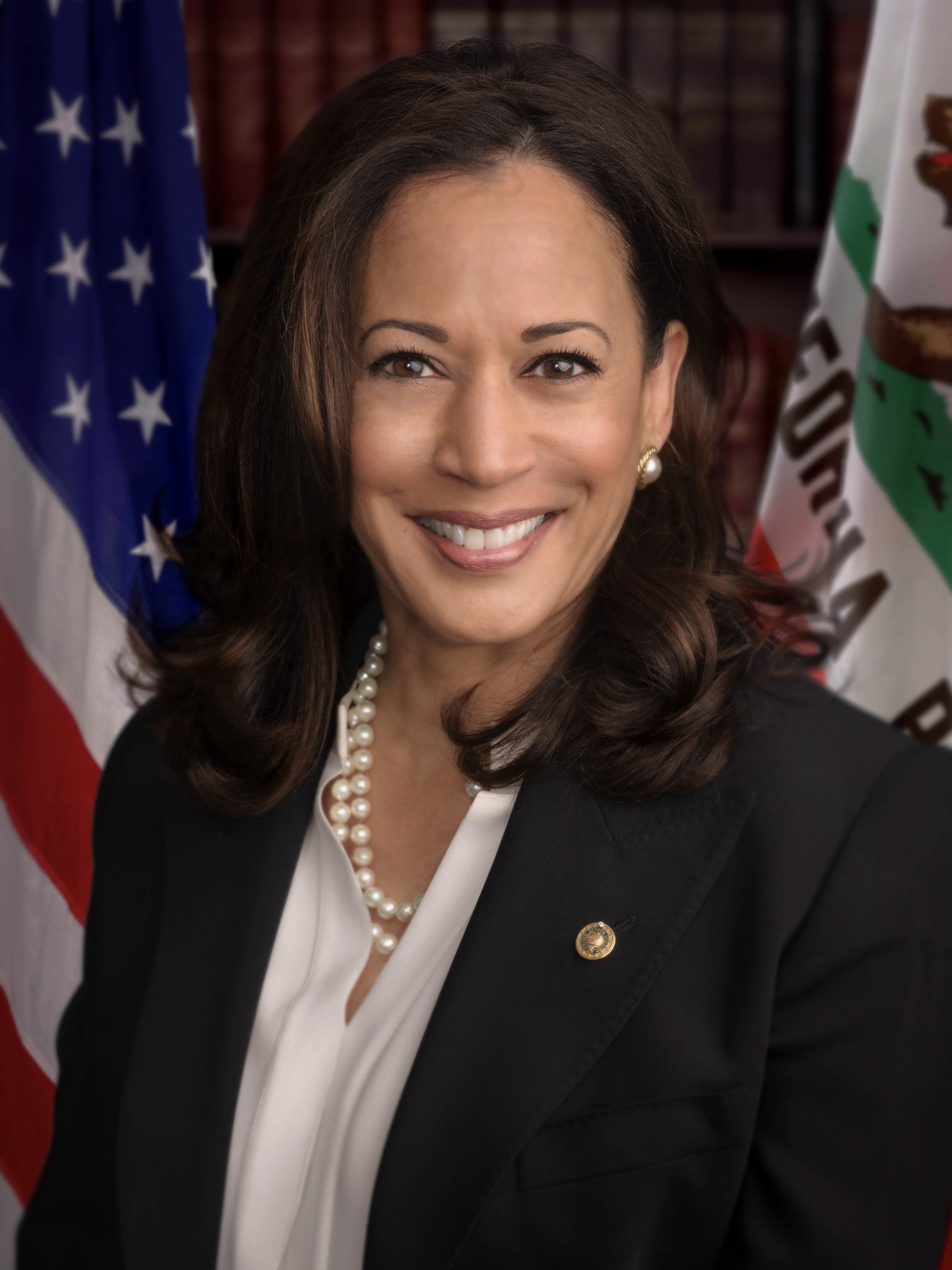
Senate official portrait, 2017

After more than 20 years as a U.S. senator from California, Senator Barbara Boxer announced on January 13, 2015, that she would not run for reelection in 2016. Harris announced her candidacy for the Senate seat the next week. She was a top contender from the beginning of her campaign.

The 2016 California Senate election used California's new top-two primary format, where the top two candidates in the primary advance to the general election regardless of party. On February 27, 2016, Harris won 78% of the California Democratic Party vote at the party convention, allowing her campaign to receive financial support from the party. Three months later, Governor Jerry Brown endorsed her. In the June 7 primary, Harris came in first with 40% of the vote and won with pluralities in most counties. Harris faced representative and fellow Democrat Loretta Sanchez in the general election.

On July 19, President Barack Obama and Vice President Joe Biden endorsed Harris. In the November 2016 election, Harris defeated Sanchez with over 60% of the vote, carrying all but four counties. After her victory, she promised to protect immigrants from the policies of president-elect Donald Trump and announced her intention to remain attorney general through the end of 2016. Harris became the second Black woman and first South Asian American senator in history.

=== Tenure and political positions ===
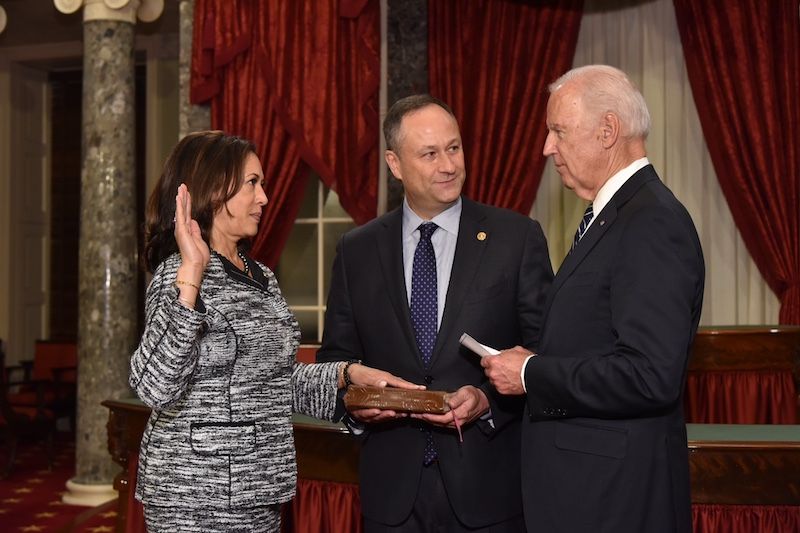
Harris being sworn into the Senate by then vice president Joe Biden in January 2017. At center is Harris's husband, Doug Emhoff.

As a senator, Harris advocated stricter gun control laws, the DREAM Act, federal legalization of cannabis, and healthcare and taxation reforms. She became well known nationally after questioning several Trump appointees such as Jeff Sessions and Brett Kavanaugh.

==== 2017 ====
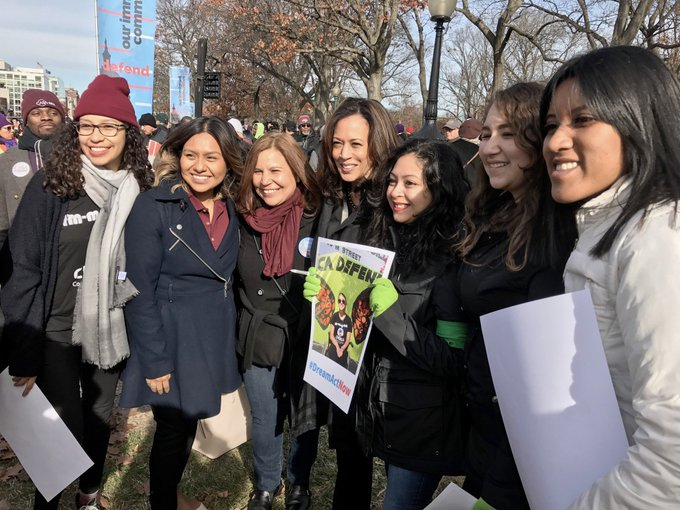
Harris with DREAMers, December 2017

On January 28, after Trump signed Executive Order 13769, barring citizens from several Muslim-majority countries from entering the U.S. for 90 days, she condemned the order and was one of many to call it a "Muslim ban". She called White House Chief of Staff John F. Kelly at home to gather information and push back against the executive order.

In February, Harris spoke in opposition to Trump's cabinet picks Betsy DeVos for secretary of education and Jeff Sessions for United States attorney general. In early March, she called on Sessions to resign, after it was reported that Sessions, who had previously said he "did not have communications with the Russians", spoke twice with Russian ambassador to the United States Sergey Kislyak.

In April, Harris voted against the confirmation of Neil Gorsuch to the U.S. Supreme Court. Later that month, she took her first foreign trip to the Middle East, visiting California troops stationed in Iraq and the Zaatari refugee camp in Jordan, the largest camp for Syrian refugees.

In June, Harris garnered media attention for her questioning of Rod Rosenstein, the deputy attorney general, over the role he played in the May 2017 firing of James Comey, the director of the Federal Bureau of Investigation. The prosecutorial nature of her questioning caused Senator John McCain, an ex officio member of the Intelligence Committee, and Senator Richard Burr, the committee chairman, to interrupt her and request that she be more respectful of the witness. A week later, she questioned Jeff Sessions, the attorney general, on the same topic. Sessions said her questioning "makes me nervous". Burr's singling out of Harris sparked suggestions in the news media that his behavior was sexist, with commentators arguing that Burr would not treat a male Senate colleague in a similar manner.

In December, Harris called for the resignation of Senator Al Franken, writing on Twitter, "Sexual harassment and misconduct should not be allowed by anyone and should not occur anywhere."

==== 2018 ====
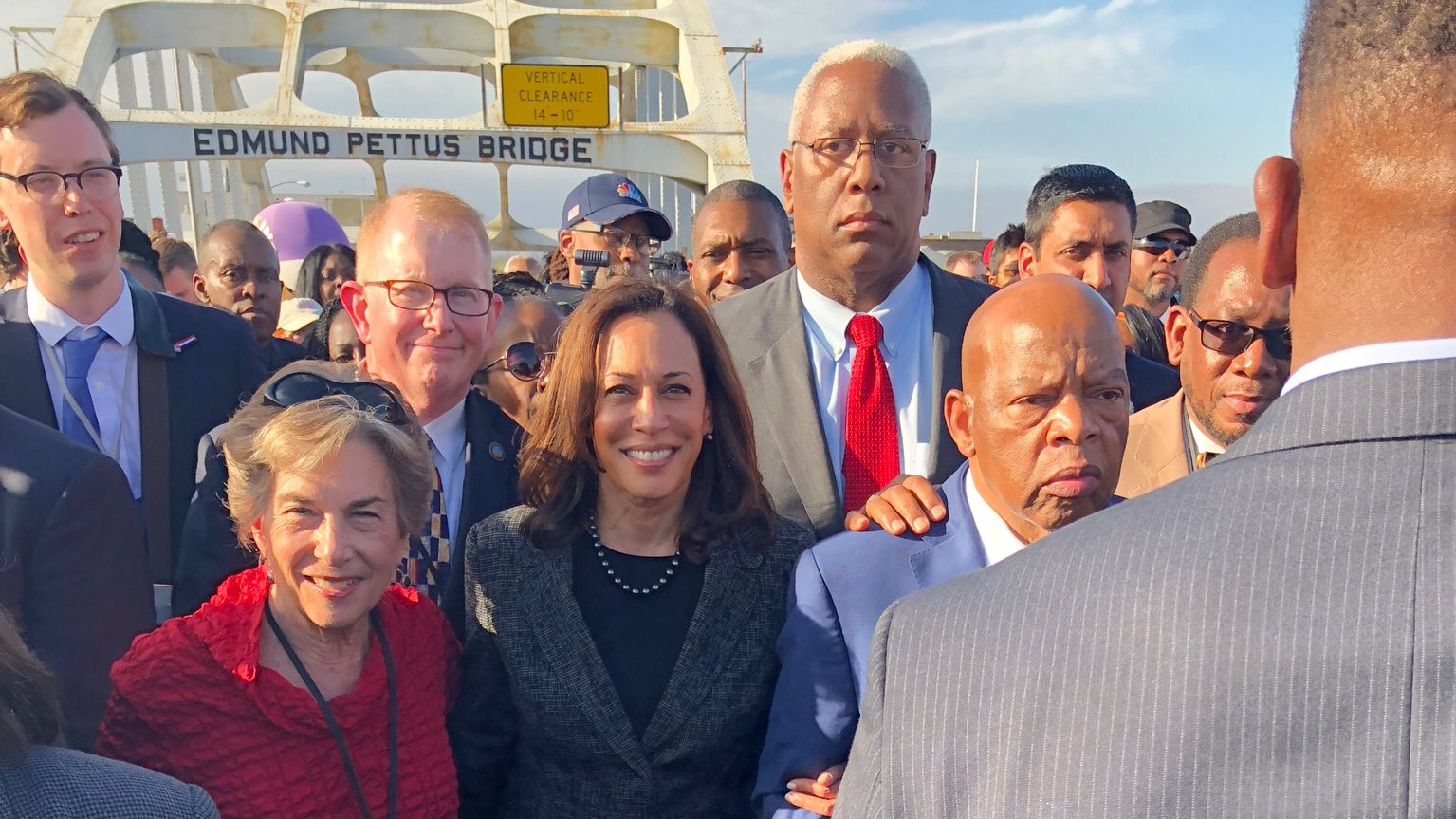
Harris at the commemoration of Bloody Sunday in Selma, Alabama where she was invited to speak by John Lewis (right), January 2018

In January, Harris was appointed to the Senate Judiciary Committee after Franken resigned. Later that month, she questioned Homeland Security Secretary Kirstjen Nielsen for favoring Norwegian immigrants over others and for claiming to be unaware that Norway is a predominantly white country.

Also in January, Harris and senators Heidi Heitkamp, Jon Tester, and Claire McCaskill co-sponsored the Border and Port Security Act, legislation to mandate that U.S. Customs and Border Protection "hire, train and assign at least 500 officers per year until the number of needed positions the model identifies is filled" and require the commissioner of Customs and Border Protection to determine potential equipment and infrastructure improvements for ports of entry.

In May, Harris heatedly questioned Nielsen about the Trump administration family separation policy, under which children were separated from their families when their parents were taken into custody for illegally entering the U.S. In June, after visiting one of the detention facilities near the border in San Diego, Harris became the first senator to demand Nielsen's resignation.

In the September and October Brett Kavanaugh Supreme Court confirmation hearings, Harris questioned Brett Kavanaugh about a meeting he may have had regarding the Mueller Investigation with a member of Kasowitz Benson Torres, the law firm founded by Donald Trump's personal attorney, Marc Kasowitz. Kavanaugh was unable to answer and repeatedly deflected. Harris also participated in questioning the FBI director's limited scope of the investigation of Kavanaugh regarding allegations of sexual assault. She voted against his confirmation.

Harris was a target of the October 2018 United States mail bombing attempts.

In December, the Senate passed the Justice for Victims of Lynching Act (S. 3178), sponsored by Harris. The bill, which died in the House, would have made lynching a federal hate crime.

==== 2019 ====
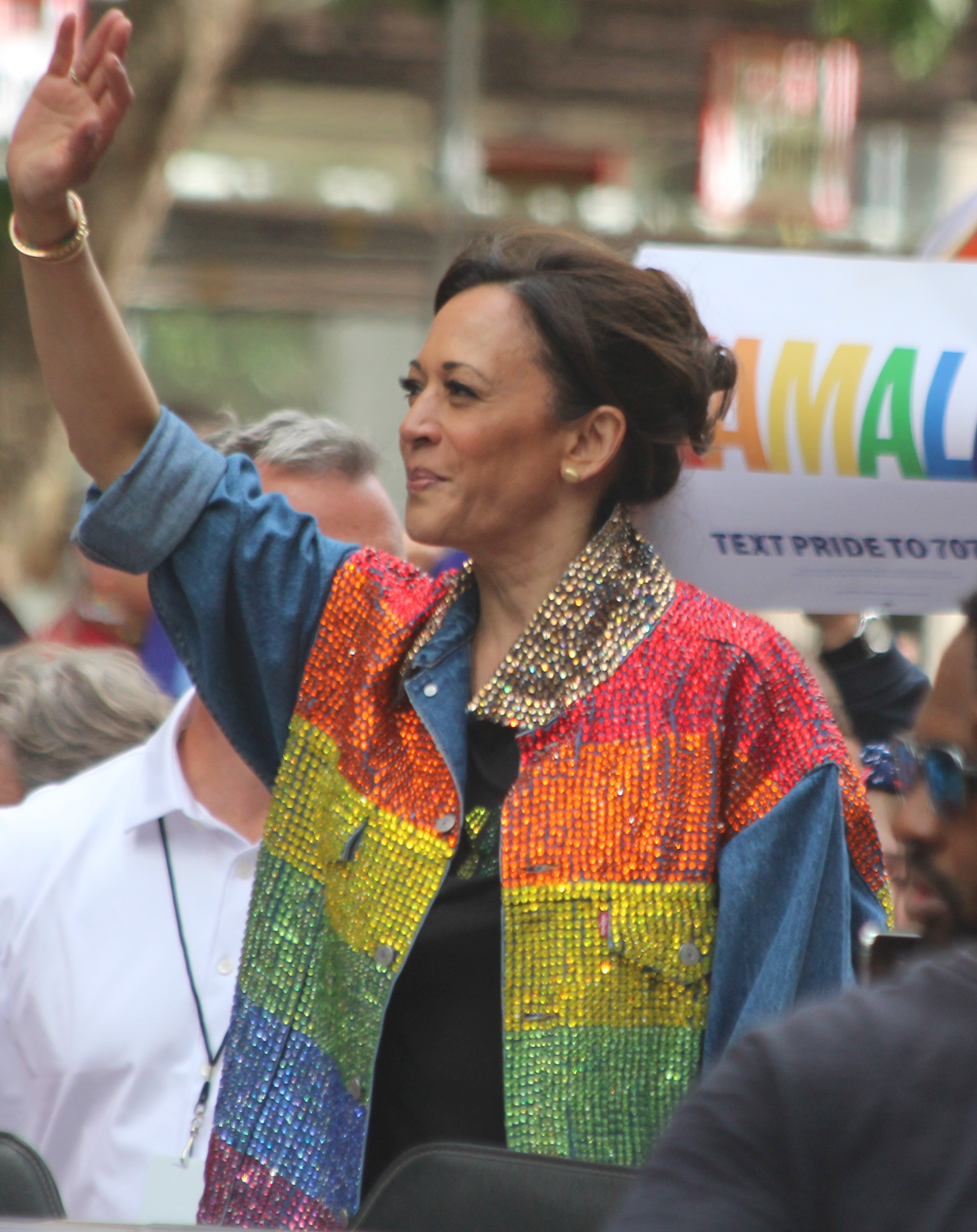
Harris at the San Francisco Pride parade, June 2019

Harris supported busing for desegregation of public schools, saying, "the schools of America are as segregated, if not more segregated, today than when I was in elementary school." She viewed busing as an option to be considered by school districts, rather than the responsibility of the federal government.

Harris was an early co-sponsor of the Green New Deal, a plan to transition the country towards generating 100 percent renewable electricity by 2030.

In March 2019, after special counsel Robert Mueller submitted his report on Russian interference in the 2016 election, Harris called for U.S. attorney general William Barr to testify before Congress in the interests of transparency. Two days later, Barr released a four-page "summary" of the redacted Mueller Report, which was criticized as a deliberate mischaracterization of its conclusions. Later that month, Harris was one of 12 Democratic senators led by Mazie Hirono to sign a letter questioning Barr's decision to offer "his own conclusion that the President's conduct did not amount to obstruction of justice", and called for an investigation into whether Barr's summary of the Mueller report and his statements at a news conference were misleading.

In April 2019, Harris was one of 34 Senate Democrats and independents to write a letter urging President Trump not to cut aid to El Salvador, Guatemala, and Honduras. The group wrote:

We encourage you to listen to members of your own Administration and reverse a decision that will damage our national security and aggravate conditions inside Central America....Since taking office, you have consistently expressed a flawed understanding of U.S. foreign assistance. It is neither charity, nor is it a gift to foreign governments. Our national security funding is specifically designed to promote American interests, enhance our collective security, and protect the safety of our citizens... By obstructing the use of [Fiscal Year 2018] national security funding and seeking to terminate similar funding from [Fiscal Year 2017], you are personally undermining efforts to promote U.S. national security and economic prosperity.

On May 1, 2019, Barr testified before the Senate Judiciary Committee. During the hearing, he remained defiant about the misrepresentations in the four-page summary he had released ahead of the full report. When asked by Harris whether he had reviewed the underlying evidence before deciding not to charge Trump with obstruction of justice, Barr admitted that neither he, Rod Rosenstein, nor anyone in his office had reviewed the evidence supporting the report before making the charging decision. Harris later called for Barr to resign, accusing him of refusing to answer her questions because he could open himself up to perjury, and saying his responses disqualified him from serving as U.S. attorney general. Two days later, Harris demanded again that Department of Justice inspector general Michael E. Horowitz investigate whether Barr acceded to pressure from the White House to investigate Trump's political enemies.

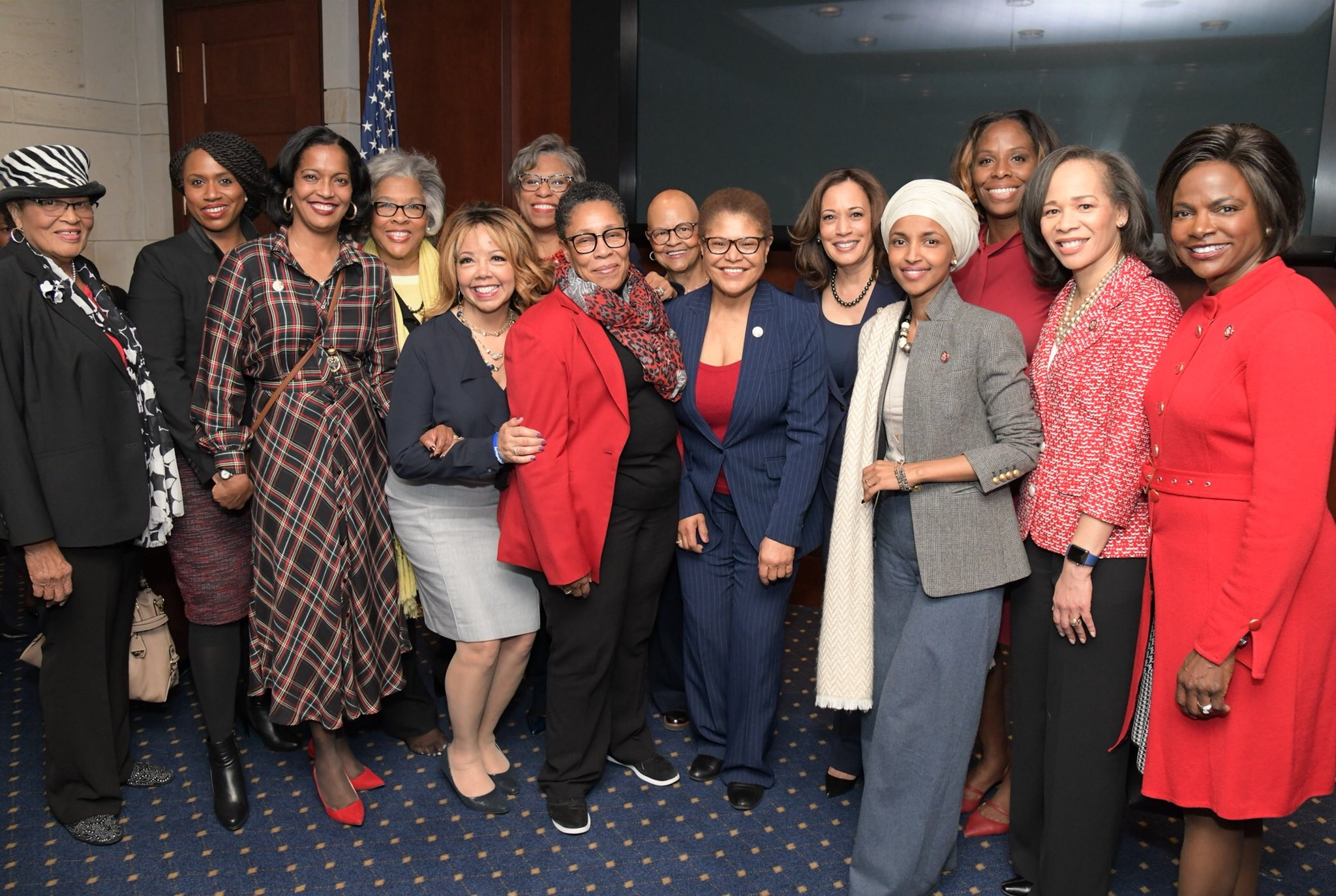
Harris with women of the Congressional Black Caucus in January 2019

On May 5, 2019, Harris said "voter suppression" prevented Democrats Stacey Abrams and Andrew Gillum from winning the 2018 gubernatorial elections in Georgia and Florida; Abrams lost by 55,000 votes and Gillum by 32,000. According to election law expert Richard L. Hasen, "I have seen no good evidence that the suppressive effects of strict voting and registration laws affected the outcome of the governor's races in Georgia and Florida."

In July, Harris teamed with Kirsten Gillibrand to urge the Trump administration to investigate the persecution of Uyghurs in China by the Chinese Communist Party; in this question she was joined by Senator Marco Rubio.

In November, Harris called for an investigation into the death of Roxsana Hernández, a transgender woman and immigrant who died in ICE custody.

In December, Harris led a group of Democratic senators and civil rights organizations in demanding the removal of White House senior adviser Stephen Miller after emails published by the Southern Poverty Law Center revealed frequent promotion of white nationalist literature to Breitbart website editors.

==== 2020 ====
Harris speaks at Donald Trump's first impeachment trial in January 2020.

Before the opening of the impeachment trial of Donald Trump on January 16, 2020, Harris delivered remarks on the floor of the Senate, stating her views on the integrity of the American justice system and the principle that nobody, including an incumbent president, is above the law. She later asked Senate Judiciary chairman Lindsey Graham to halt all judicial nominations during the impeachment trial, to which Graham acquiesced. Harris voted to convict Trump on charges of abuse of power and obstruction of Congress.

Harris worked on bipartisan bills with Republican co-sponsors, including a bail reform bill with Rand Paul, an election security bill with James Lankford, and a workplace harassment bill with Lisa Murkowski.

==== 2021 ====
Following her election as Vice President of the United States, Harris resigned from her seat on January 18, 2021, before taking office on January 20; she was replaced by California secretary of state Alex Padilla.

=== Committee assignments ===
While in the Senate, Harris was a member of the following committees:

- Committee on the Budget
- Committee on Homeland Security and Governmental Affairs
  - Subcommittee on Federal Spending Oversight and Emergency Management
  - Subcommittee on Regulatory Affairs and Federal Management
- Select Committee on Intelligence
- Committee on the Judiciary
  - Subcommittee on the Constitution
  - Subcommittee on Oversight, Agency Action, Federal Rights and Federal Courts
  - Subcommittee on Privacy, Technology and the Law

=== Caucus memberships ===
- Congressional Asian Pacific American Caucus
- Congressional Black Caucus
- Congressional Caucus for Women's Issues

== 2020 presidential election ==
=== Presidential campaign ===
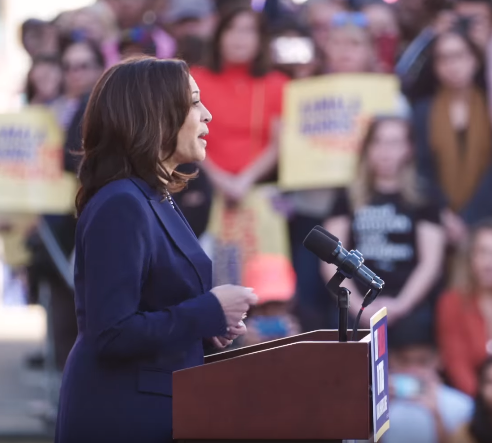
Harris announces her run for the 2020 Democratic nomination for president in Oakland, California, January 2019.

Harris had been considered a top contender and potential front-runner for the 2020 Democratic nomination for president. In June 2018, she said she was "not ruling it out". In July 2018, it was announced that she would publish a memoir, a sign of a possible run. On January 21, 2019, Harris officially announced her candidacy for president of the United States in the 2020 presidential election. In the first 24 hours after her announcement, she tied a record set by Bernie Sanders in 2016 for the most donations raised in the day after an announcement. More than 20,000 people attended her campaign launch event in her hometown of Oakland, California, on January 27, according to a police estimate.

During the first Democratic presidential debate in June 2019, Harris scolded former vice president Joe Biden for "hurtful" remarks he made, speaking fondly of senators who opposed integration efforts in the 1970s and working with them to oppose mandatory school bussing. Harris's support rose by between six and nine points in polls after that debate. In the second debate in August, Biden and Representative Tulsi Gabbard confronted Harris over her record as attorney general. The San Jose Mercury News assessed that some of Gabbard's and Biden's accusations were on point, such as blocking the DNA testing of a death row inmate, while others did not withstand scrutiny. In the immediate aftermath of the debate, Harris fell in the polls. Over the next few months her poll numbers fell to the low single digits. Harris faced criticism from reformers for tough-on-crime policies she pursued while she was California's attorney general. In 2014, she defended California's death penalty in court.

Before and during her presidential campaign, an online informal organization using the hashtag #KHive formed to support Harris's candidacy and defend her from racist and sexist attacks. According to the Daily Dot, Joy Reid first used the term in an August 2017 tweet saying "@DrJasonJohnson @ZerlinaMaxwell and I had a meeting and decided it's called the K-Hive."

On December 3, 2019, Harris withdrew from the 2020 presidential election, citing a shortage of funds. In March 2020, she endorsed Joe Biden for president.

=== Vice presidential campaign ===
Biden/Harris logo

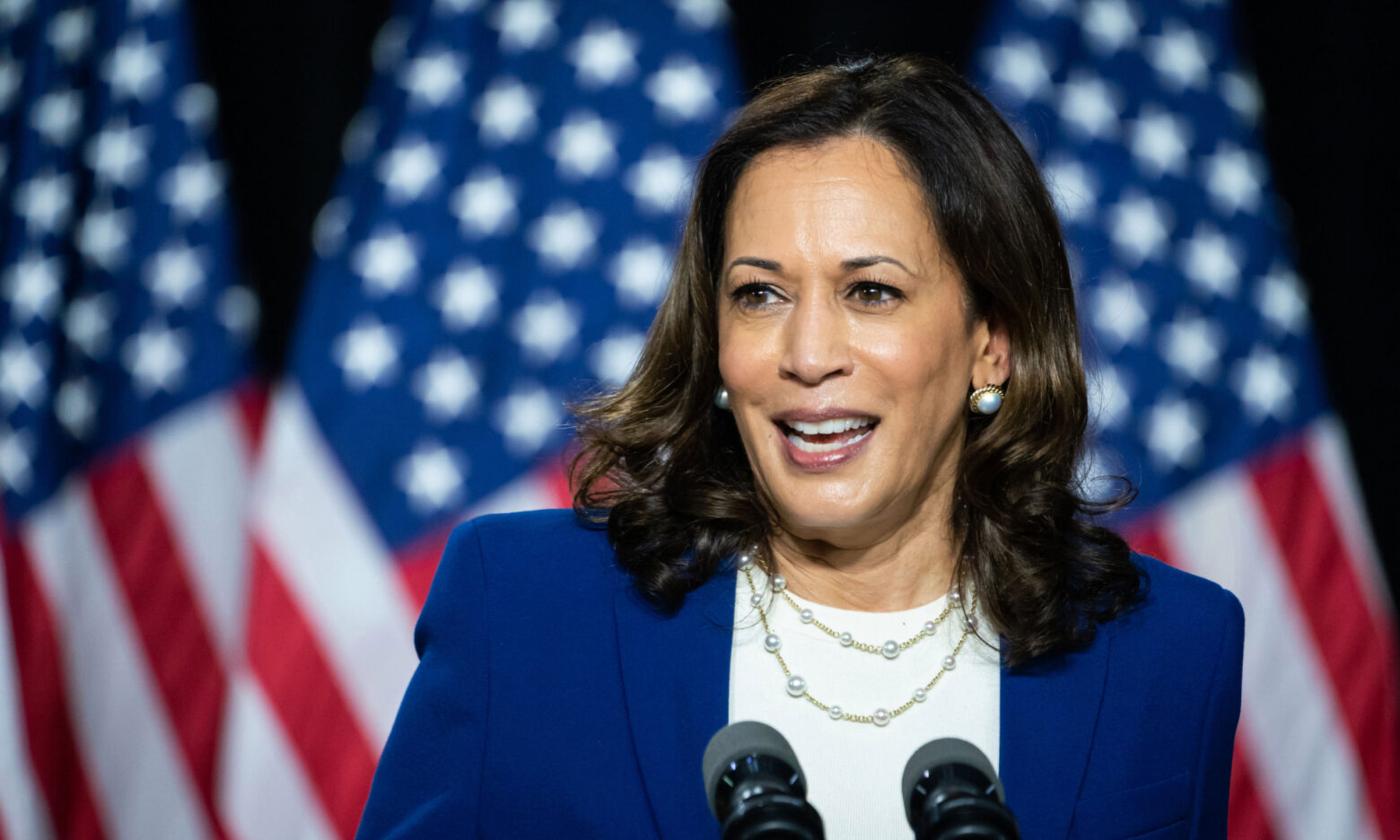
Harris announces her candidacy for vice president in Wilmington, Delaware, August 2020

In May 2019, senior members of the Congressional Black Caucus endorsed the idea of a Biden–Harris ticket. In late February 2020, Biden won a landslide victory in the 2020 South Carolina Democratic primary with the endorsement of House whip Jim Clyburn, with more victories on Super Tuesday. In early March, Clyburn suggested Biden choose a black woman as a running mate, saying, "African American women needed to be rewarded for their loyalty". In March, Biden committed to choosing a woman for his running mate.

On April 17, 2020, Harris responded to media speculation and said she "would be honored" to be Biden's running mate. In late May, in relation to the murder of George Floyd and ensuing protests and demonstrations, Biden faced renewed calls to select a black woman as his running mate, highlighting the law enforcement credentials of Harris and Val Demings.

On June 12, The New York Times reported that Harris was emerging as the front-runner to be Biden's running mate, as she was the only African American woman with the political experience typical of vice presidents. On June 26, CNN reported that more than a dozen people close to the Biden search process considered Harris one of Biden's top four contenders, along with Elizabeth Warren, Val Demings, and Keisha Lance Bottoms.

On August 11, 2020, Biden announced he had chosen Harris. She was the first African American, the first Indian American, and the third woman after Geraldine Ferraro and Sarah Palin to be the vice-presidential nominee on a major-party ticket. Harris is also the first resident of the Western United States to appear on the Democratic Party's national ticket.

Harris became the vice president–elect after Biden won the 2020 presidential election.

== Vice presidency (2021–2025) ==
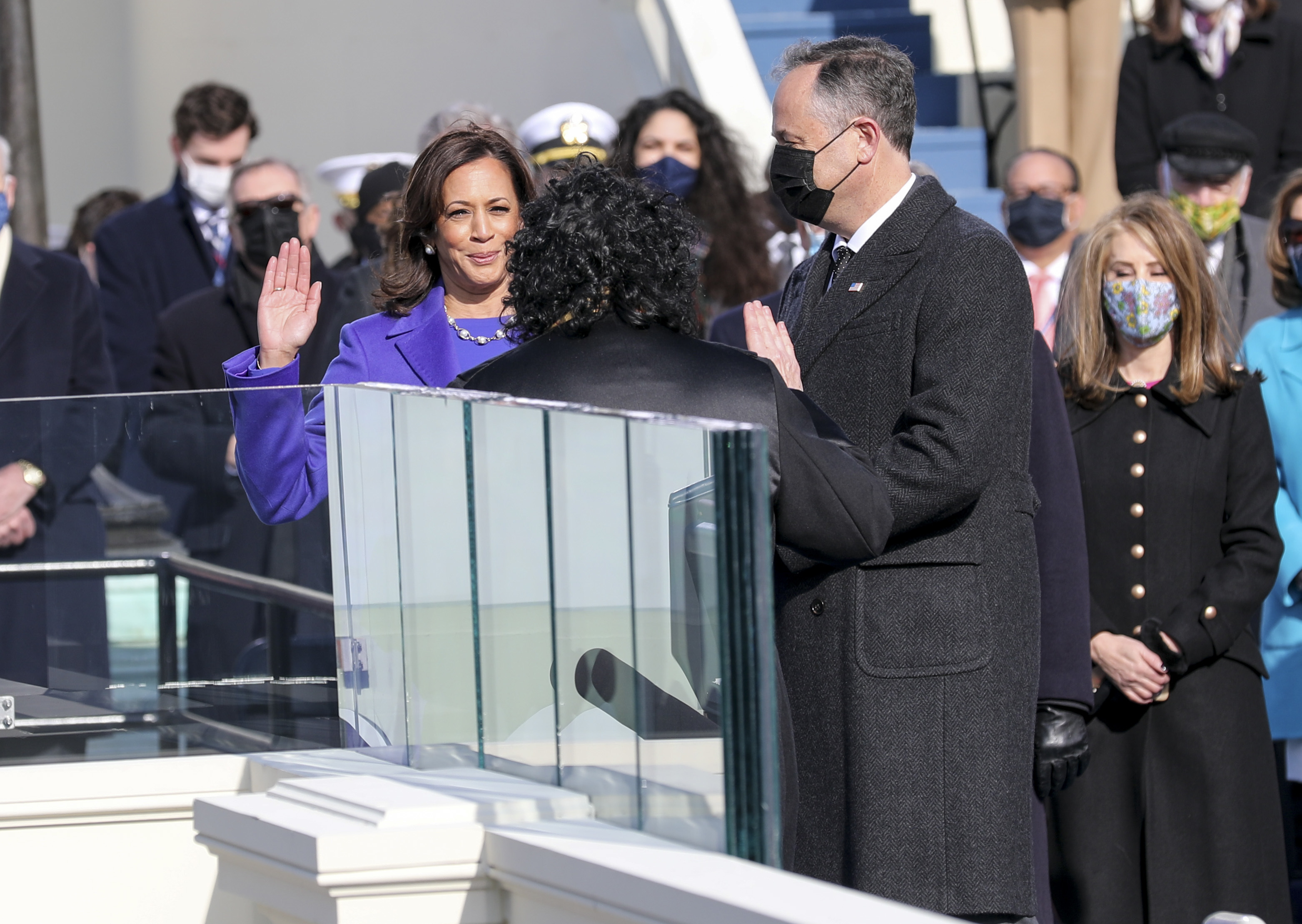
Harris being sworn in as vice president by Supreme Court Justice Sonia Sotomayor on January 20, 2021

Harris was sworn in as vice president at 11:40 a.m. on January 20, 2021, by Justice Sonia Sotomayor. She is the United States' first woman vice president, first African-American vice president, and first Asian-American vice president. Harris is the third person with acknowledged non-European ancestry to become president or vice president. (Note: The other two are President Barack Obama and Vice President Charles Curtis, a Native American and member of the Kaw Nation, who was vice president under Herbert Hoover from 1929 to 1933.)

Her first act as vice president was to swear in three new senators: Alex Padilla (her successor in the Senate) and Georgia senators Raphael Warnock and Jon Ossoff.

=== Senate presidency ===
When Harris took office, the 117th Congress's Senate was divided 50–50 between Republicans and Democrats; this meant that she was often called upon to exercise her power to cast tie-breaking votes as president of the Senate. Harris cast her first two tie-breaking votes on February 5. In February and March, Harris's tie-breaking votes were required to pass the American Rescue Plan Act of 2021 stimulus package Biden proposed, since no Senate Republicans voted for it. On July 20, Harris broke Mike Pence's record for tie-breaking votes in the first year of a vice presidency when she cast the seventh tie-breaking vote in her first six months. She cast 13 tie-breaking votes during her first year in office, the most tie-breaking votes in a single year in U.S. history, surpassing John Adams, who cast 12 in 1790. On December 5, 2023, Harris broke the record for the most tie-breaking votes cast by a vice president, casting her 32nd vote, exceeding John C. Calhoun, who cast 31 votes during his nearly eight years in office. When she left office, she had cast 33 such votes. On November 19, 2021, Harris served as acting president from 10:10 to 11:35 am EST while Biden underwent a colonoscopy. She was the first woman, and the third person overall, to assume the powers and duties of the presidency as acting president of the United States.

As early as December 2021, Harris was identified as playing a pivotal role in the Biden administration owing to her tie-breaking vote in the evenly divided Senate as well as her being the presumed front-runner in 2024 if Biden did not seek reelection.

=== Immigration ===
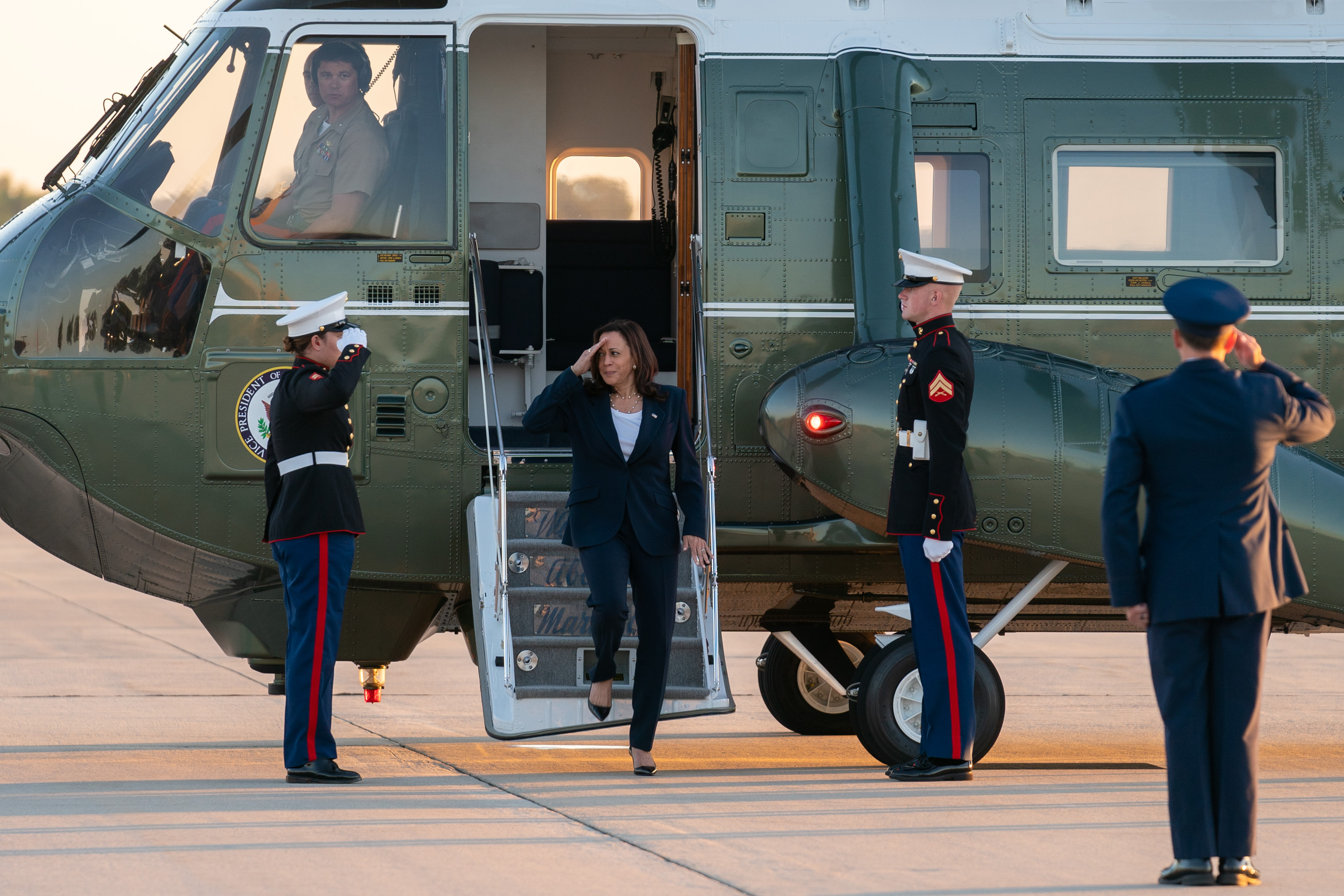
Harris disembarks Marine Two at Joint Base Andrews beginning a trip to El Paso, Texas, June 2021

On March 24, 2021, Biden assigned Harris to work with Mexico and Northern Triangle nations (El Salvador, Guatemala, and Honduras) to stem irregular migration to the Mexico–United States border and address the root causes of migration. The Root Causes Strategy (RCS) was the product of this effort. Multiple news organizations at the time described Harris as a "border czar", though Harris rejected the title and never actually held it. Republicans and other critics began using the term "border czar" to tie Harris to the Mexico–United States border crisis, including in a July 2024 House resolution, despite her having no authority over the border itself.

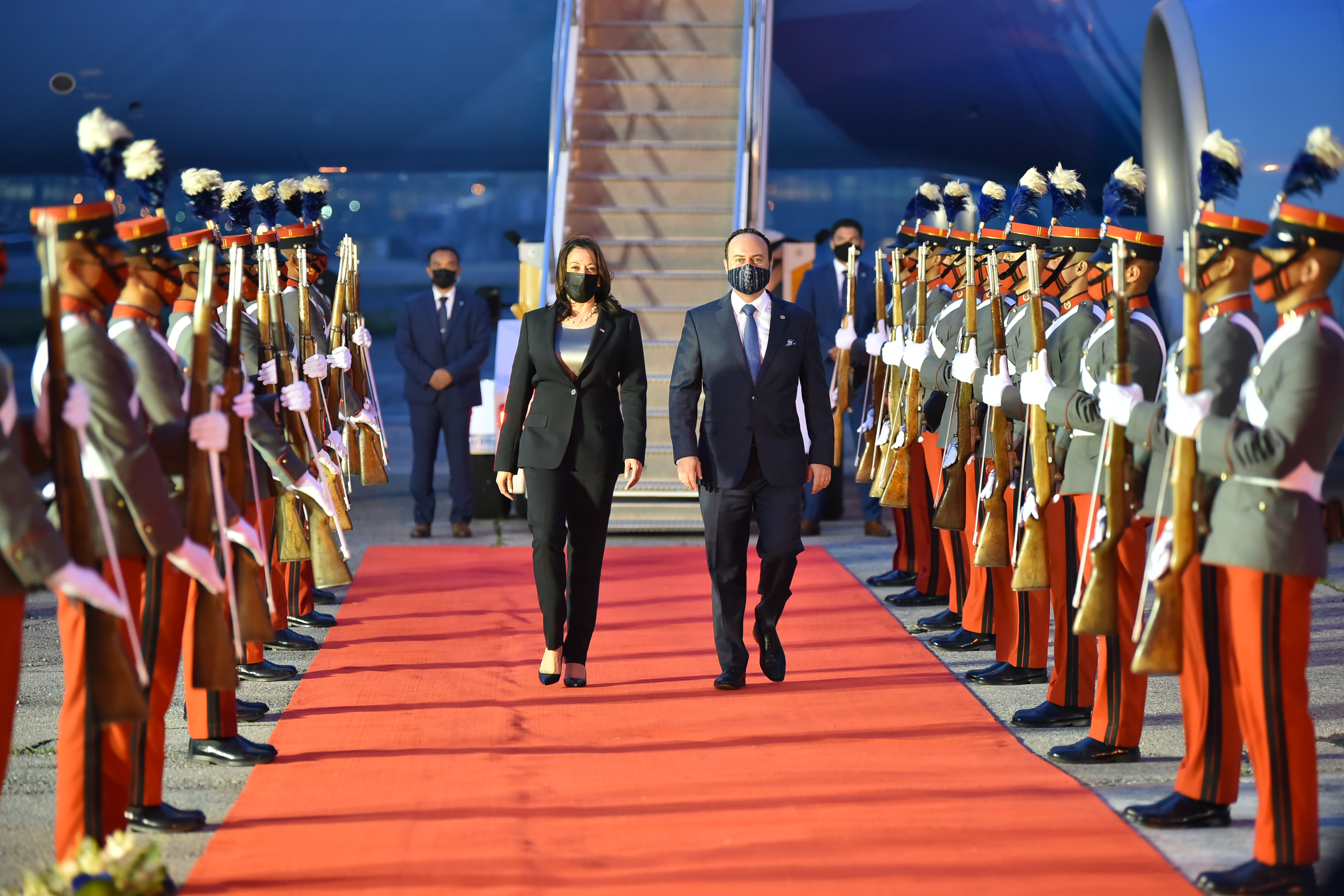
Harris arrives in Guatemala City during her first foreign trip as vice president, June 2021

Harris conducted her first international trip as vice president in June 2021, visiting Guatemala and Mexico in an attempt to address the root causes of an increase in migration from Central America to the United States. During her visit, in a joint press conference with Guatemalan president Alejandro Giammattei, Harris issued an appeal to potential migrants: "I want to be clear to folks in the region who are thinking about making that dangerous trek to the United States-Mexico border: Do not come. Do not come." Her work in Central America led to creation of:

- Task forces on corruption and human trafficking
- The Partnership for Central America
- The women's empowerment program in Her Hands, part of the Partnership for Central America
- Investment funds for housing and businesses

=== Foreign policy ===
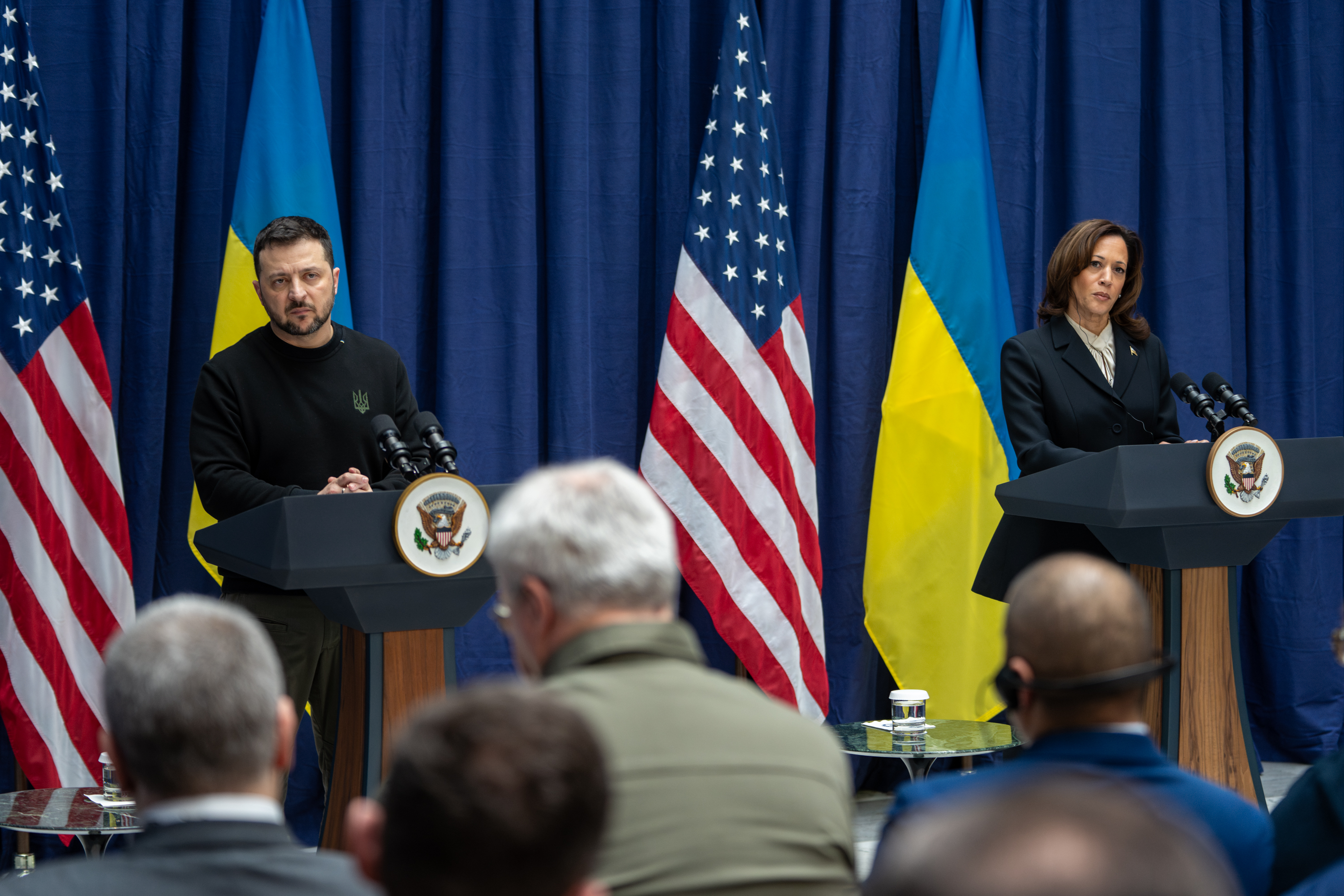
Vice President Harris at a press conference at the Commerzbank in Munich with Ukrainian president Volodymyr Zelenskyy, February 2024

Harris met with French president Emmanuel Macron in November 2021 to strengthen ties after the contentious cancellation of a submarine program. Another meeting was held in November 2022 during Macron's visit to the U.S., resulting in an agreement to strengthen U.S.–France space cooperation across civil, commercial, and national security sectors.

In April 2021, Harris said she was the last person in the room before Biden decided to remove all U.S. troops from Afghanistan, adding that Biden had "an extraordinary amount of courage" and "make[s] decisions based on what he truly believes ... is the right thing to do". National Security Advisor Jake Sullivan said that Biden "insists she be in every core decision-making meeting. She weighs in during those meetings, often providing unique perspectives." Harris assumed a "key diplomatic role" in the Biden administration, particularly after the Russian invasion of Ukraine in February 2022, after which she was dispatched to Germany and Poland to rally support for arming Ukraine and imposing sanctions on Russia.

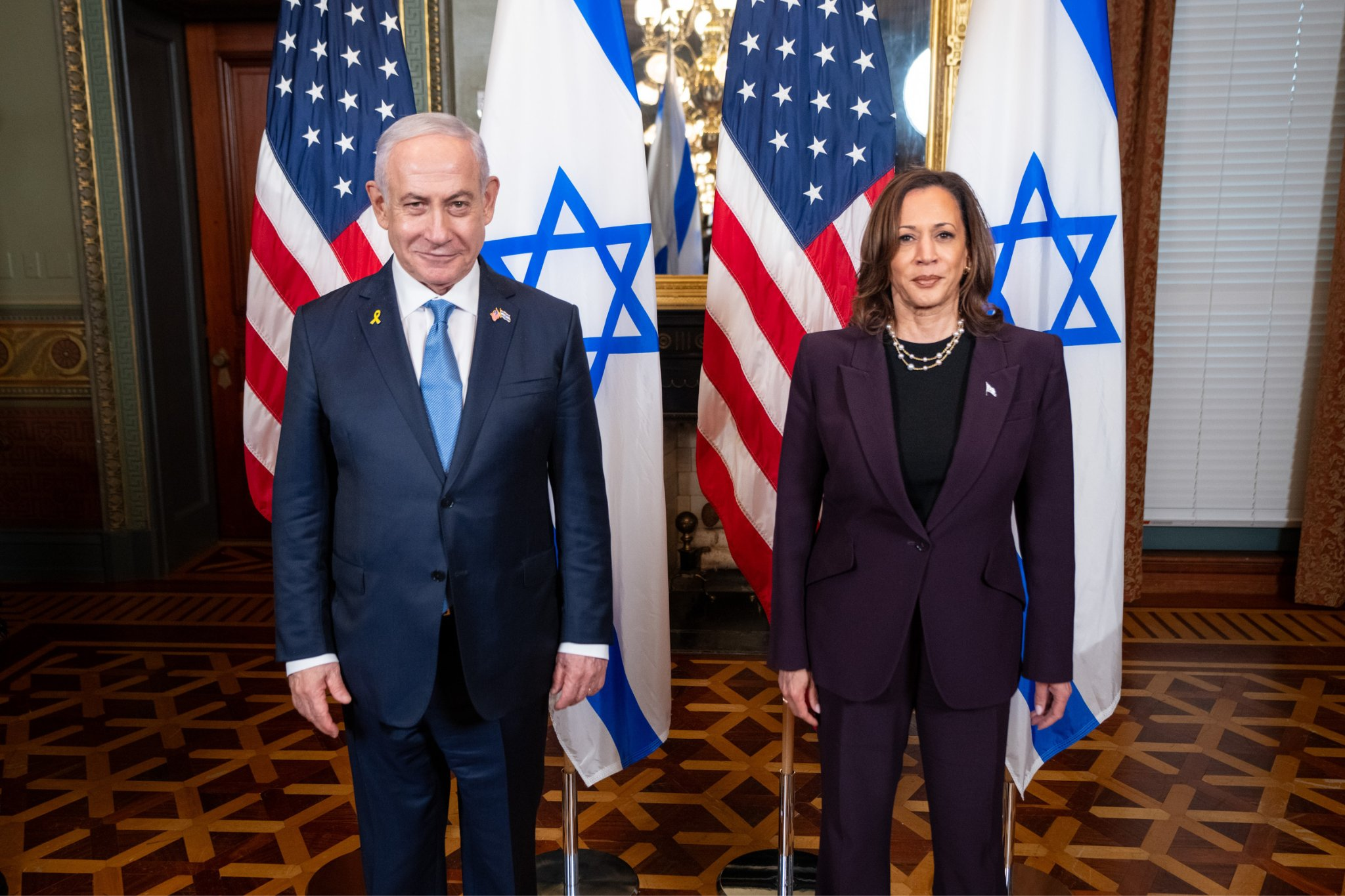
Harris meeting with Israeli prime minister Benjamin Netanyahu at the White House on July 25, 2024

In April 2023, Harris visited Goddard Space Flight Center in Maryland with South Korean president Yoon Suk Yeol and agreed to work to strengthen the space alliance between the U.S. and South Korea. "We renew our commitment to strengthen our cooperation in the next frontier of our expanding alliance, and of course that is space", Harris said at a joint news conference with Yoon.

In November 2023, Harris pledged that the Biden administration would place no conditions on U.S. aid to Israel in its war with Hamas in Gaza. In March 2024, she said: "Given the immense scale of suffering in Gaza, there must be an immediate ceasefire for at least the next six weeks...This will get the hostages out and get a significant amount of aid in."

== 2024 presidential election ==
=== Vice-presidential campaign ===
In April 2023, President Biden initially announced his reelection campaign, with Harris widely expected to remain his running mate. After the Democratic primaries, the pair became the party's presumptive nominees in the 2024 presidential election. Concerns about Biden's age and health persisted throughout Biden's first term, with renewed scrutiny after his performance in the first presidential debate, on June 27.

=== Presidential campaign ===
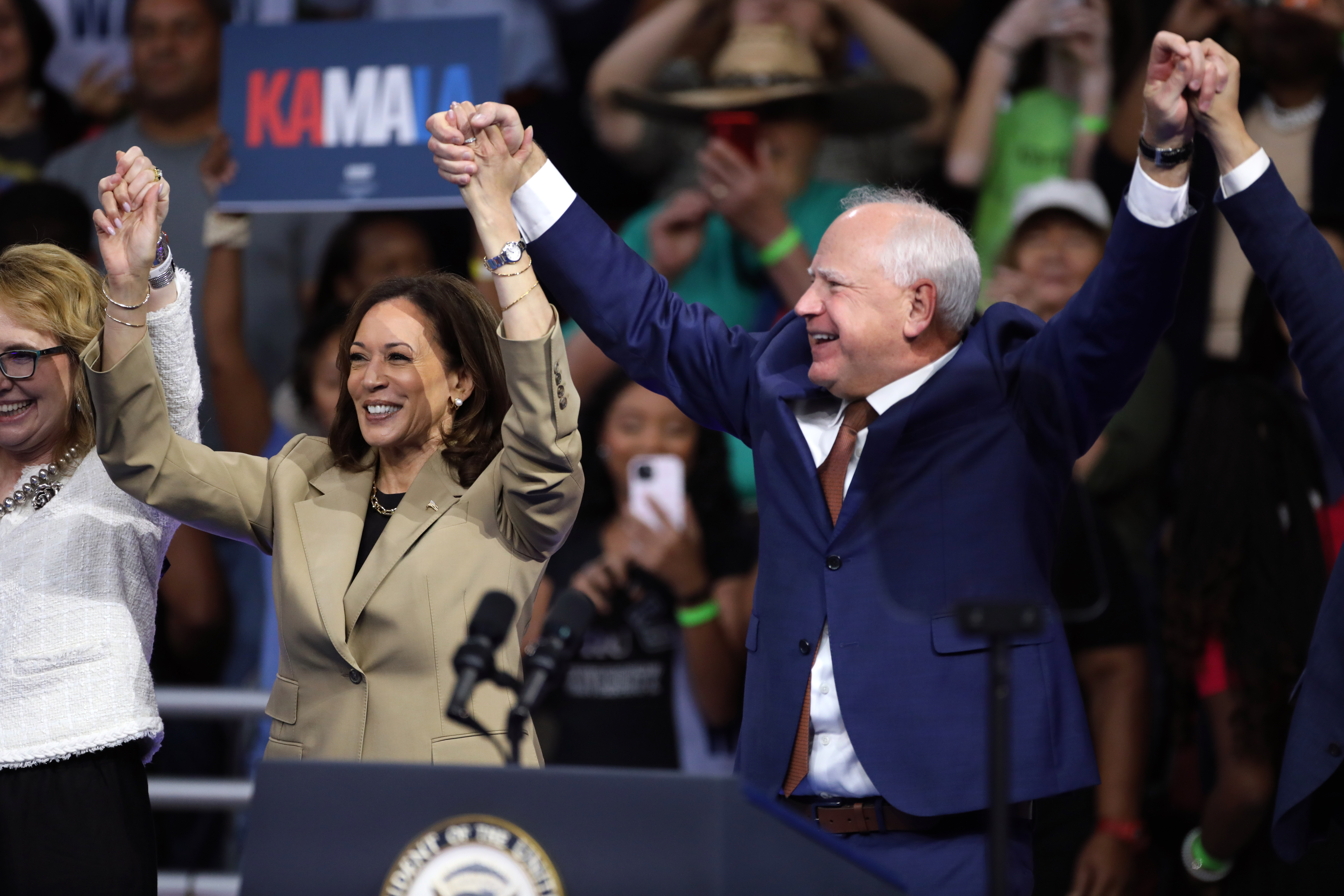
Harris and Tim Walz at a presidential campaign rally at Desert Diamond Arena in Glendale, Arizona, August 2024

The 2024 election with electoral votes by state

On July 21, 2024, Biden suspended his reelection campaign and immediately endorsed Harris to replace him as the party's presidential nominee. She was also endorsed by Jimmy Carter, Bill and Hillary Clinton, Barack and Michelle Obama, the Congressional Black Caucus, and many others. In the first 24 hours of her candidacy, her campaign raised $81 million in small-dollar donations, the highest single-day total of any presidential candidate in history. Harris is the first nominee who did not participate in the primaries since Vice President Hubert Humphrey in 1968. She also had the shortest general election presidential campaign in history, at 107 days.

By August 5, Harris had officially secured the nomination via a virtual roll call of delegates. The next day, she announced Minnesota governor Tim Walz as her vice-presidential running mate. On August 22, the fourth day of the Democratic National Convention, Harris officially accepted the Democratic nomination for president.

On September 10, 2024, ABC News hosted the presidential debate between Harris and Trump in Philadelphia, Pennsylvania. In the debate, Trump tried to portray Harris as a "radical liberal". Harris's sharpest criticisms of Trump came on abortion rights, where she said she would restore women's rights to what they were under Roe. Harris was declared the winner of the debate by several political analysts, including columnists from CNN, Politico, The New York Times, and USA Today. Some analysts noted that for Harris, this was the "best debate performance of her career", in which she forcefully highlighted her strengths and rattled former president Trump. After the debate, Harris got a prominent celebrity endorsement from Taylor Swift. However, the polls remained close and showed Harris had a hard time conveying that she could represent a "change".

On October 30, Harris delivered a half-hour speech at the Ellipse in Washington, D.C., intended as a "closing argument" for her campaign. Her statements about tax-funded gender-affirming surgery for transgender people in prison were attacked by Trump, who spent millions on a political advertisement that said, "Kamala is for they/them, President Trump is for you." Trump's campaign spent more money on the advertisement than any other in the campaign.

Harris lost the 2024 United States presidential election to Trump on November 5, 2024. She conceded the race the next day in a speech at her alma mater, Howard University. Harris lost the Electoral College vote, 312 to 226, and the popular vote, 48.3% to 49.8%. She became the first Democratic nominee since John Kerry in 2004 to lose the popular vote. (Note: Democratic nominees Barack Obama in 2008 and 2012, Hillary Clinton in 2016, and Joe Biden in 2020 won the popular vote in four consecutive elections.) Losses in the "blue wall" states of Wisconsin, Michigan, and Pennsylvania were considered key to her defeat, as were losses in the swing states of Nevada, Arizona, Georgia, and North Carolina. Harris's loss was part of a global backlash against incumbent parties in 2024, which occurred in part because of the 2021–2023 inflation surge. All 50 states and DC trended rightward compared to the 2020 presidential election. On January 6, 2025, in her role as president of the Senate, Harris oversaw the certification of Trump and Vance as the winners of the election. Had she won, Harris would have been the first female and first Asian-American president of the United States, and the second African-American president after Obama.

== Post-vice presidency (2025–present) ==
Harris left office on January 20, 2025, and was succeeded by the 50th vice president of the United States, JD Vance. She and her husband moved to Los Angeles, where they helped distribute food to victims of the Palisades Fire.

On February 18, 2025, Harris signed with Creative Artists Agency (CAA) to focus on speaking and publishing opportunities. Four days later, she received the chairman's prize at the 56th NAACP Image Awards.

On March 21, 2025, President Trump took away a courtesy normally extended to former vice presidents by revoking Harris's security clearance.

On April 30, 2025, Harris delivered remarks at a gala for the 20th anniversary of Emerge America in which she criticized the Trump administration, mainly for its handling of the economy and social issues. The next week, Vogue reported that Harris made a surprise appearance and her formal debut at the 2025 Met Gala, dressed in half white and black.

Some speculated that Harris would run in the 2026 California gubernatorial election; in July 2025, she announced she would not. According to The Hill, few top Democratic officials have discouraged her from running in the 2028 presidential election, with some publicly saying they would support her should she decide to run.

Under federal law, former vice presidents receive six months of Secret Service protection. Harris's protection would have normally expired on July 21, 2025, but President Biden had extended it for an additional year by signing a directive before he left office. On August 28, 2025, President Trump signed a memorandum canceling her protection as of September 1.

On September 23, 2025, Harris published a memoir, 107 Days, detailing her 2024 presidential campaign. She embarked on an international tour to promote the book. Simon & Schuster CEO Jonathan Karp said the book was one of the best-selling memoirs in the 2020s.

While promoting the book on the BBC's Sunday with Laura Kuenssberg, Harris said she could "possibly" be a candidate in the 2028 presidential election. In the same interview, she wondered whether she should have urged Biden not to run in 2024 and whether her silence was an act of "grace or recklessness".

Harris has been involved in the 2026 midterm elections, endorsing and campaigning for multiple candidates, including Jasmine Crockett and later James Talarico in the 2026 United States Senate election in Texas.

== Political positions ==
Harris's domestic platform supports national abortion protections, LGBTQ+ rights, stricter gun control, and limited legislation to address climate change. On immigration, she supports an earned pathway to citizenship and increases in border security, as well as addressing the root causes of illegal immigration by means of the RCS program.

On foreign policy, Harris supports continued military aid to Ukraine and Israel in their respective wars, but insists that Israel should agree to a ceasefire and hostage deal and work toward a two-state solution. She opposes an arms embargo on Israel. Harris has departed from Biden on economic issues, proposing what has been called a "populist" economic agenda.

=== Abortion ===
Harris supports abortion rights, and reproductive health care was central to her presidential campaign. She has been called "the Biden administration's voice for reproductive rights" and "the White House's voice of unflinching support for reproductive health rights." Several abortion rights and women's organizations supported her after Biden withdrew from the race, with Reproductive Freedom for All saying "there is nobody who has fought as hard [as Harris] for abortion rights and access" and EMILY's List calling her "our most powerful advocate and messenger" on reproductive rights.

As of 2020, Harris had a 100% rating from the abortion rights advocacy group Planned Parenthood Action Fund, and a 0% rating from the anti-abortion group National Right to Life Committee. EMILY's List endorsed her in 2015, during her senatorial campaign.

=== LGBTQ rights ===
As California attorney general, Harris refused to defend Proposition 8 in federal court, and after Proposition 8 was struck down in Hollingsworth v. Perry in 2013, she ordered the Los Angeles County Clerk's office to "start the marriages immediately". She officiated at the wedding of the plaintiffs in the case, Kris Perry and Sandy Stier, at San Francisco City Hall.

As a member of the U.S. Senate, Harris co-sponsored the Equality Act.

In July 2018, Harris led her colleagues in introducing the Gay and Trans Panic Defense Prohibition Act of 2018, a nationwide bill that would curtail the effectiveness of the so-called gay and trans panic defenses, an issue she pioneered as district attorney of San Francisco.

In October 2019, Harris participated in a CNN/Human Rights Campaign town hall on LGBTQ rights and pledged her support for "all of the folks who are fighting for equality" in cases that would determine whether gay and transgender people are protected under laws banning federal workplace discrimination. Harris drew attention to the epidemic of hate crimes committed against Black trans women (at the time 20 killed that year), noting that LGBTQ people of color are doubly discriminated against.

Harris has since been criticized for a 2015 federal court motion she filed to block gender-affirming medical care for a transgender inmate serving in a California state prison while she was California attorney general, after the Ninth Circuit Court of Appeals had ruled that denying that treatment violated the 8th Amendment's prohibition of cruel and unusual punishment.

=== Criminal justice ===
In December 2018, Harris voted for the First Step Act, legislation aimed at reducing recidivism rates among federal prisoners by expanding job training and other programs, in addition to forming an expansion of early release programs and modifications on sentencing laws such as mandatory minimum sentences for nonviolent drug offenders, "to more equitably punish drug offenders".

In March 2020, Harris was one of 15 senators to sign a letter to the Federal Bureau of Prisons and private prison companies GEO Group, CoreCivic, and Management and Training Corporation requesting information on their strategy to address the COVID-19 pandemic, asserting that it was "critical that [you] have a plan to help prevent the spread of the novel coronavirus to incarcerated individuals and correctional staff, along with their families and loved ones, and provide treatment to incarcerated individuals and staff who become infected."

In June 2020, after a campaign by a coalition of community groups, including Black Lives Matter, Los Angeles Mayor Eric Garcetti announced Los Angeles Police Department budget cuts of $150 million. Harris supported the decision.

In 2020 Harris tweeted in support of donations to the Minnesota Freedom Fund, a bail fund assisting those arrested in the George Floyd protests, though she did not donate to the fund herself.

Harris's criminal justice record has been seen as mixed, with critics calling her "tough on crime" even though she called herself a "progressive prosecutor", citing her reluctance to release prisoners and anti-truancy policies. In her 2009 book, Harris criticized liberals for what she called "biases against law enforcement".

== Personal life ==
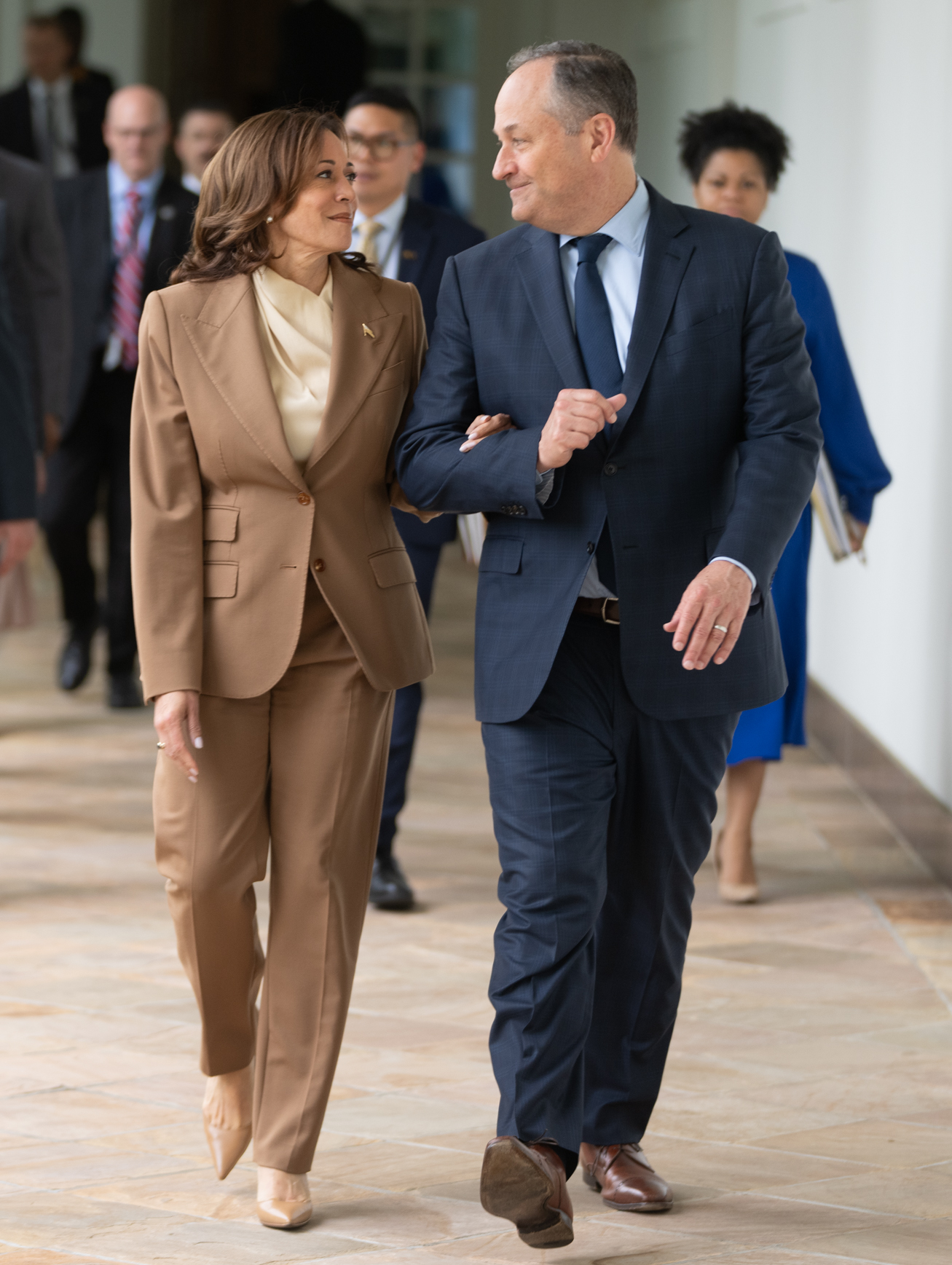
Vice President Harris and her husband, Second Gentleman Doug Emhoff at the White House, May 2024

In the 1990s, Harris dated Willie Brown, Speaker of the California Assembly (1980–1995) and then mayor of San Francisco (1996–2004). Although still technically married, Brown had been separated from his wife for over a decade during his relationship with Harris. In 2001, Harris briefly dated talk show host Montel Williams.

Harris met her husband, attorney Doug Emhoff, through a mutual friend who set them up on a blind date in 2013. Emhoff, who was born in a Jewish family, was an entertainment lawyer who became partner-in-charge at Venable LLP's Los Angeles office. Harris and Emhoff married on August 22, 2014, in Santa Barbara, California. Harris is stepmother to Emhoff's two children, Cole and Ella, from his previous marriage to the film producer Kerstin Emhoff. As of August 2024, Harris and her husband had an estimated net worth of $8 million.

Harris is a Baptist, holding membership of the Third Baptist Church of San Francisco, a congregation of the American Baptist Churches USA. She is a member of The Links, an invitation-only social and service organization of prominent Black American women. Harris is a gun owner.

== Public image ==
Though the public had an unfavorable view of Harris as vice president, setting a record low, her public image improved after Biden withdrew his candidacy for reelection. Her approval rating rose 13% among Democrats.

Harris quips, "You think you just fell out of a coconut tree?" during a speech on May 10, 2023

Harris experienced high staff turnover during her vice-presidential tenure, including the departures of her chief of staff, deputy chief of staff, press secretary, deputy press secretary, communications director, and chief speechwriter. Critics alleged that this turnover reflected dysfunction and demoralization. Axios reported that at least some of the turnover was due to exhaustion from a demanding transition into the new administration, as well as financial and personal considerations. For most of her tenure, Harris had one of the lowest approval ratings of any vice president. According to a RealClear Politics polling average, a record low of 34.8% of Americans had a favorable view of her in August 2022, but this number rose rapidly after she became the presumptive Democratic presidential nominee in July 2024. Harris had a net favorable rating by September 9.

In 2024, a video clip from 2023 of Harris saying "You think you just fell out of a coconut tree? You exist in the context of all in which you live and what came before you" at a White House event went viral. Since the launch of her 2024 presidential campaign, that and other Harris remarks have been widely shared as memes, resulting in press coverage of her public image.

Harris's often boisterous laughter (Note: In terms of its type, it is often described as a cackle or guffaw. An example of it can be seen in the "coconut tree" video exhibited on the right of this section.) has been called one of her "most defining and most dissected personal traits". She says she got her laugh from her mother.

== Publications ==
Harris has written three nonfiction books and one children's book:

- Harris, Kamala; O'C. Hamilton, Joan (2009). Smart on Crime: A Career Prosecutor's Plan to Make Us Safer. San Francisco: Chronicle Books. ISBN 978-0-8118-6528-9. OCLC 191927227.
- Harris, Kamala (January 8, 2019). The Truths We Hold: An American Journey. New York: Penguin Press. ISBN 978-0525560715. OCLC 1176569148.
- Harris, Kamala (January 8, 2019). Superheroes Are Everywhere. Illustrated by Mechal Renee Roe. New York: Philomel Books. ISBN 978-1-9848-3749-3. OCLC 1135291675.
- Harris, Kamala (September 23, 2025). 107 Days. New York City: Simon & Schuster. ISBN 978-1668211656.

== See also ==
- Black women in American politics
- Charles Curtis
- List of vice presidents of the United States
- List of African-American United States Cabinet members
- List of African-American United States presidential and vice presidential candidates
- List of African-American United States Senate candidates
- List of African-American United States senators
- List of Asian Americans and Pacific Islands Americans in the United States Congress
- List of female state attorneys general in the United States
- List of female United States Cabinet members
- List of female United States presidential and vice presidential candidates
- List of politicians of Indian descent § United States
- List of United States Democratic Party presidential candidates
- List of United States Democratic Party presidential tickets
- List of United States senators from California
- Women in the United States Senate

== Notes ==
Legal offices
Preceded by Terence Hallinan	District Attorney of San Francisco; 2004–2011	Succeeded by George Gascón
Preceded by Jerry Brown	Attorney General of California; 2011–2017	Succeeded by Kathleen Kenealy; Acting
Party political offices
Preceded by Barbara Boxer	Democratic nominee for U.S. Senator from California (Class 3); 2016	Succeeded by Alex Padilla
Preceded by Tim Kaine	Democratic nominee for Vice President of the United States; 2020	Succeeded by Tim Walz
Preceded by Joe Biden	Democratic nominee for President of the United States; 2024	Most recent
U.S. Senate
Preceded by Barbara Boxer	U.S. Senator (Class 3) from California; 2017–2021; Served alongside: Dianne Feinstein	Succeeded by Alex Padilla
Political offices
Preceded by Mike Pence	Vice President of the United States; 2021–2025	Succeeded by JD Vance
U.S. order of precedence (ceremonial)
Preceded by Mike Pence as Former Vice President	United States order of precedence Former Vice President	Succeeded by Ambassadors of the United States
