= The Truths We Hold =

2019 book by Kamala Harris

The Truths We Hold: An American Journey
- Author: Kamala Harris
- Language: English
- Genre: Memoir
- Publisher: Penguin Books
- Publication date: January 8, 2019
- Publication place: United States
- Pages: 336
- ISBN: 978-0525560715
- OCLC: 1176569148
- Preceded by: Superheroes Are Everywhere

The Truths We Hold: An American Journey is a memoir by Kamala Harris. The book was first published by Penguin Books on January 8, 2019. A young readers edition was published by Philomel Books on May 7, 2019.

== Contents ==
Kamala Harris details her life as the daughter of immigrants from Jamaica and India. She was born in Oakland, California, and raised in West Berkeley. She describes her childhood neighborhood as "a close-knit neighborhood of working families who were focused on doing a good job, paying the bills, and being there for one another."

Harris would eventually become the San Francisco district attorney in 2004. Her decision to become a prosecutor was so she could serve "the victims of crimes committed and the victims of a broken criminal justice system." Understanding this dichotomy, Harris describes herself as a progressive prosecutor. She elaborates:

It is to understand that when a person takes another’s life, or a child is molested, or a woman raped, the perpetrators deserve severe consequences. That is one imperative of justice. But it is also to understand that fairness is in short supply in a justice system that is supposed to guarantee it. The job of a progressive prosecutor is to look out for the overlooked, to speak up for those whose voices aren’t being heard, to see and address the causes of crime, not just their consequences, and to shine a light on the inequality and unfairness that lead to injustice. It is to recognize that not everyone needs punishment, that what many need, quite plainly, is help.

The book continues on through her time as California Attorney General, her face-off against fellow Democrat Loretta Sanchez in the 2016 U.S. Senate election, and ends with her touting her fights against the Trump administration.

== Reception ==
Kirkus Reviews compared the book favorably to Barack Obama's memoir Dreams from My Father.

Other contemporary reviews were more mixed. Also comparing the book to Obama's follow-up memoir The Audacity of Hope, Hannah Giorgis of The Atlantic said Harris lacked Obama's literary finesse for both biography and political vision. Similarly, Danielle Kurtzleben of NPR criticized the awkward prose and lack of strong anecdotes. One such instance: Harris's brief mention of initially struggling to pass the bar exam could have been expanded into a more interesting narrative about perseverance. However, both reviewers agreed that the book served as a sufficient launching point for a potential presidential campaign. Indeed, Harris announced her 2020 presidential campaign later that January.

In a retrospective review, Carlos Lozada of The Washington Post echoed similar sentiments, while noting that Harris's kind words about the late Beau Biden (whose tenure as Delaware Attorney General overlapped with Harris's tenure in California) was a likely factor in Joe Biden's decision to select her as his 2020 campaign running mate.

== See also ==
- Category:American people of Indian Tamil descent
