= Superheroes Are Everywhere =

2019 children's picture book by Kamala Harris

- Author: Kamala Harris
- Illustrator: Mechal Renee Roe
- Language: English
- Genre: Children's literature
- Publisher: Philomel Books
- Publication date: January 8, 2019
- Publication place: United States
- Pages: 40
- ISBN: 978-1-984837-49-3
- OCLC: 1135291675
- Preceded by: Smart on Crime
- Followed by: The Truths We Hold

Superheroes Are Everywhere is a children's book written by Kamala Harris and illustrated by Mechal Renee Roe. It was published on January 8, 2019.

== Contents ==
The book teaches that superheroes can be found everywhere in real life, from family members, to friends, to teachers at school and college, based upon the author's life.

== Reception ==
Booklist said that the book "offers a solid message: a superhero could be anyone, including you [the reader]." Likewise, Common Sense Media called it an "encouraging, uplifting book [that] inspires kids to recognize the superheroes all around them and promise to be, like them, brave, kind, helpful, and more."

== Misinformation about distribution ==
An April 24, 2021 New York Post cover story by Laura Italiano falsely claimed that the book was being distributed to immigrant children in a shelter in Long Beach, California in "welcome kits." The story was later debunked—the facility has one copy of the book that was donated to its library. Chair of the Republican National Committee Ronna McDaniel, Colorado Congresswoman Lauren Boebert, and Arkansas Senator Tom Cotton promoted the rumor and suggested that Harris may have profited from the situation at the expense of taxpayers. As a result of the controversy, Italiano confirmed that she had deliberately written a false story and resigned.
