= Smart on Crime =

2009 book by Kamala Harris

Smart on Crime: A Career Prosecutor's Plan to Make Us Safer
- Author: Kamala Harris; Joan O'C. Hamilton
- Language: English
- Genre: Nonfiction
- Publisher: Chronicle Books
- Publication date: October 7, 2009
- Publication place: United States
- Pages: 205
- ISBN: 978-0-8118-6528-9
- OCLC: 864320794
- Followed by: Superheroes Are Everywhere

Smart on Crime: A Career Prosecutor's Plan to Make Us Safer is a book by Kamala Harris with Joan O'C. Hamilton, first published by Chronicle Books on October 7, 2009.

== Contents ==
First published as Harris (then the San Francisco district attorney) was beginning her 2010 campaign for California Attorney General, the book outlines her vision of how the criminal justice system should function. She explains in detail why in her view, it is not enough to simply be tough on crime, and how prosecutors and lawmakers must also be smart and reform-minded in their approach. She argues such changes would increase public safety, reduce costs, and strengthen communities.

== Reception ==
Children's Defense Fund president Marian Wright Edelman praised the book saying:

Harris speaks from experience to debunk myths and offer real solutions to many of the problems with [our] current criminal justice system. Her suggestions have the potential to change and save lives.

Some critics have observed that Harris did not pay enough attention to race, instead attributing the problem of disparities in the system to class, and mentioning racial profiling from law enforcement only twice. In one passage, she dispels the notion that communities of color are inherently hostile towards the police saying:

There is a widely held notion that poor communities, particularly poor African-American and Latino communities, consider law enforcement the enemy and that they do not want police officers in their neighborhoods. In fact, the opposite is true. Both my experience and scientific surveys reflect this fact again and again. I can state categorically that economically poor people want and support law enforcement.

In response, Harris has stated that she is aware of the racial biases in criminal justice and policing, citing her decision to become a prosecutor as an extension of the work her parents did during the civil rights movement. Those same critics have also noted that since being elected to the U.S. Senate in 2016, Harris has become more assertive on issues such as prison reform, racial equality, and scrutinizing police practices.

=== Plagiarism ===
In October 2024, an investigative report by Austrian plagiarism hunter Stefan Weber alleged that Harris plagiarized extensive portions of the book from Wikipedia and many other sources. The claims received attention when amplified by independent journalists like Christopher Rufo. Citing an analysis from plagiarism expert Jonathan Bailey, The New York Times wrote that "The five passages that Mr. Rufo cited appeared to have been taken partly from other published work without quotation marks" and concluded that "none of the passages in question took the ideas or thoughts of another writer, which is considered the most serious form of plagiarism. Instead, the sentences copy descriptions of programs or statistical information that appear elsewhere." However, after examining Weber's dossier in full, Bailey later stated that the plagiarism case was more serious than he had communicated to the Times.

Em Steck writing for CNN reported on the book that while Harris had, "...lifted language...in her 2007 congressional testimony..." that this according to Steck, "...does not constitute a serious example of plagiarism."

Reason magazine commented that, "similar [plagiarism] transgressions ended the career of Harvard University President Claudine Gay" and questioned CNN's coverage of Harris' plagiarism for receiving a more gentle handling in their reporting. Reason specifically criticized CNN's perceived imbalanced reporting as it relates to Republican's involved in or proximate to allegations of plagiarism such as Melania Trump, stating:

CNN's report on the Harris plagiarism accusation is headlined: "Conservative activist accuses Harris of plagiarizing passages in co-authored 2009 book." Note that the identity of the accuser—of the plagiarism discoverer—was not at issue in the Melania Trump case. But here, mainstream media feels compelled to position Rufo rather than Harris at the center of the controversy.
