= List of Kamala Harris 2024 presidential campaign non-political endorsements =

American political endorsements

This is a list of notable non-political figures and organizations that endorsed the Kamala Harris 2024 presidential campaign.

== Military personnel ==
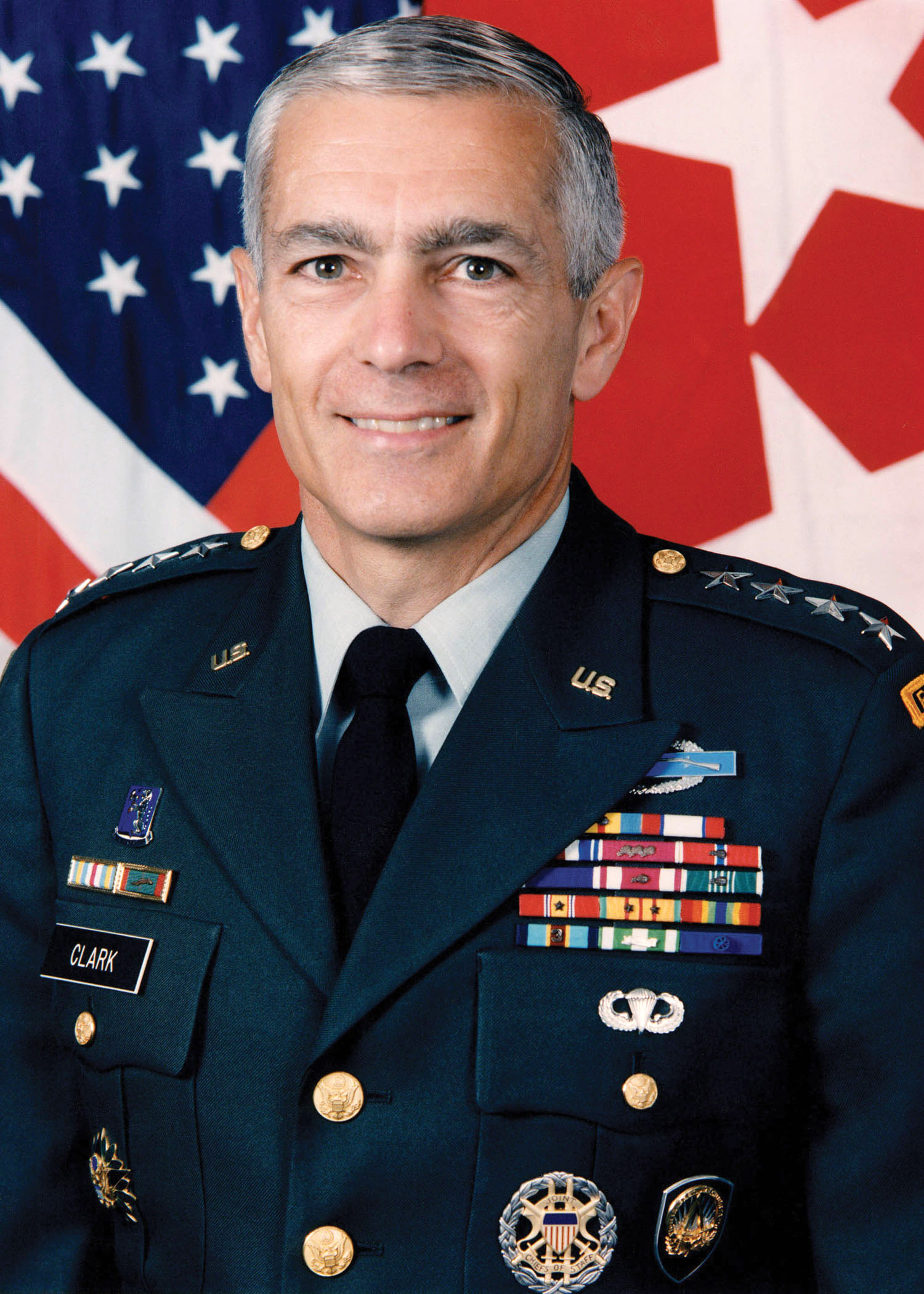
Wesley Clark

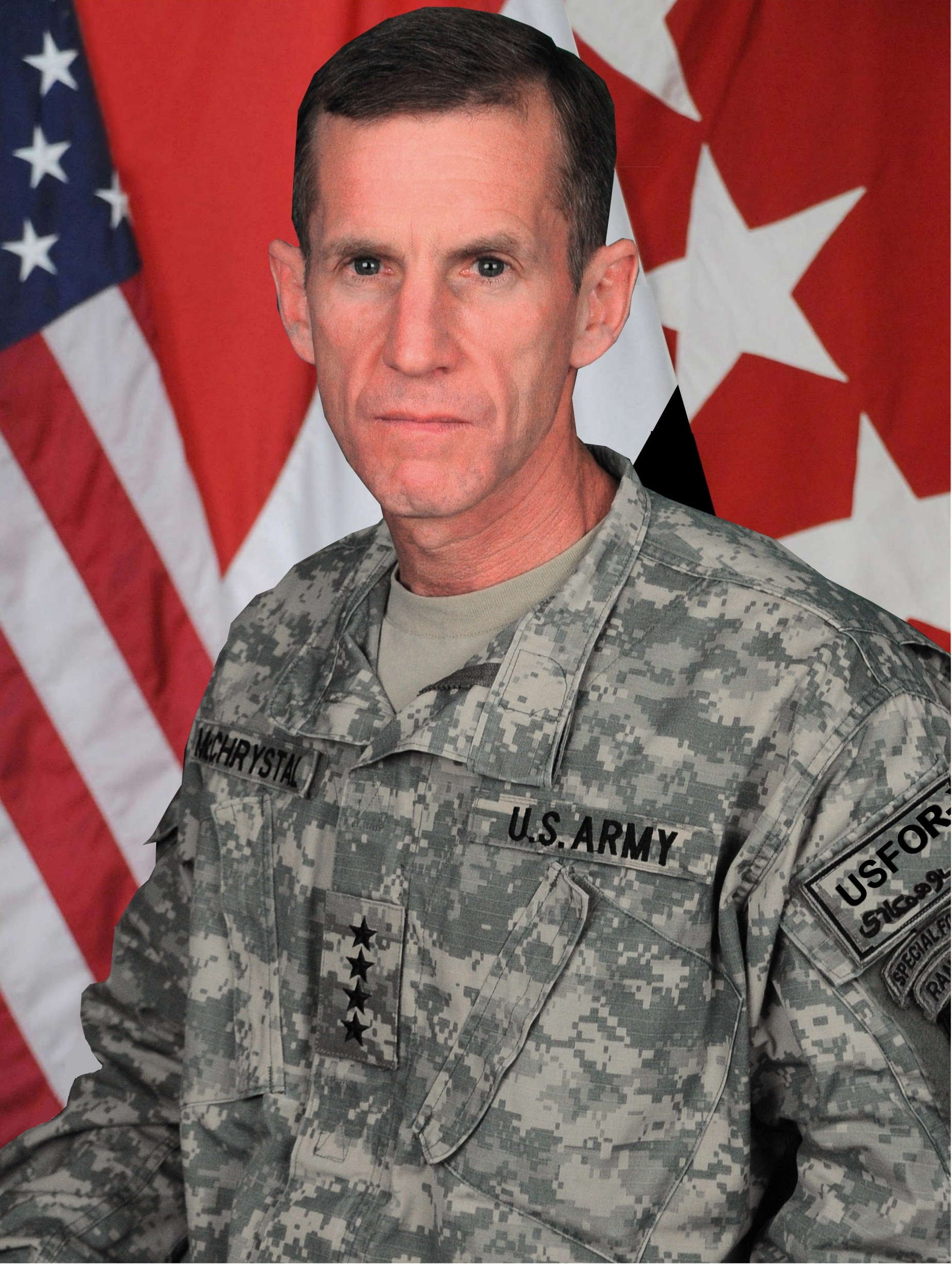
Stanley A. McChrystal

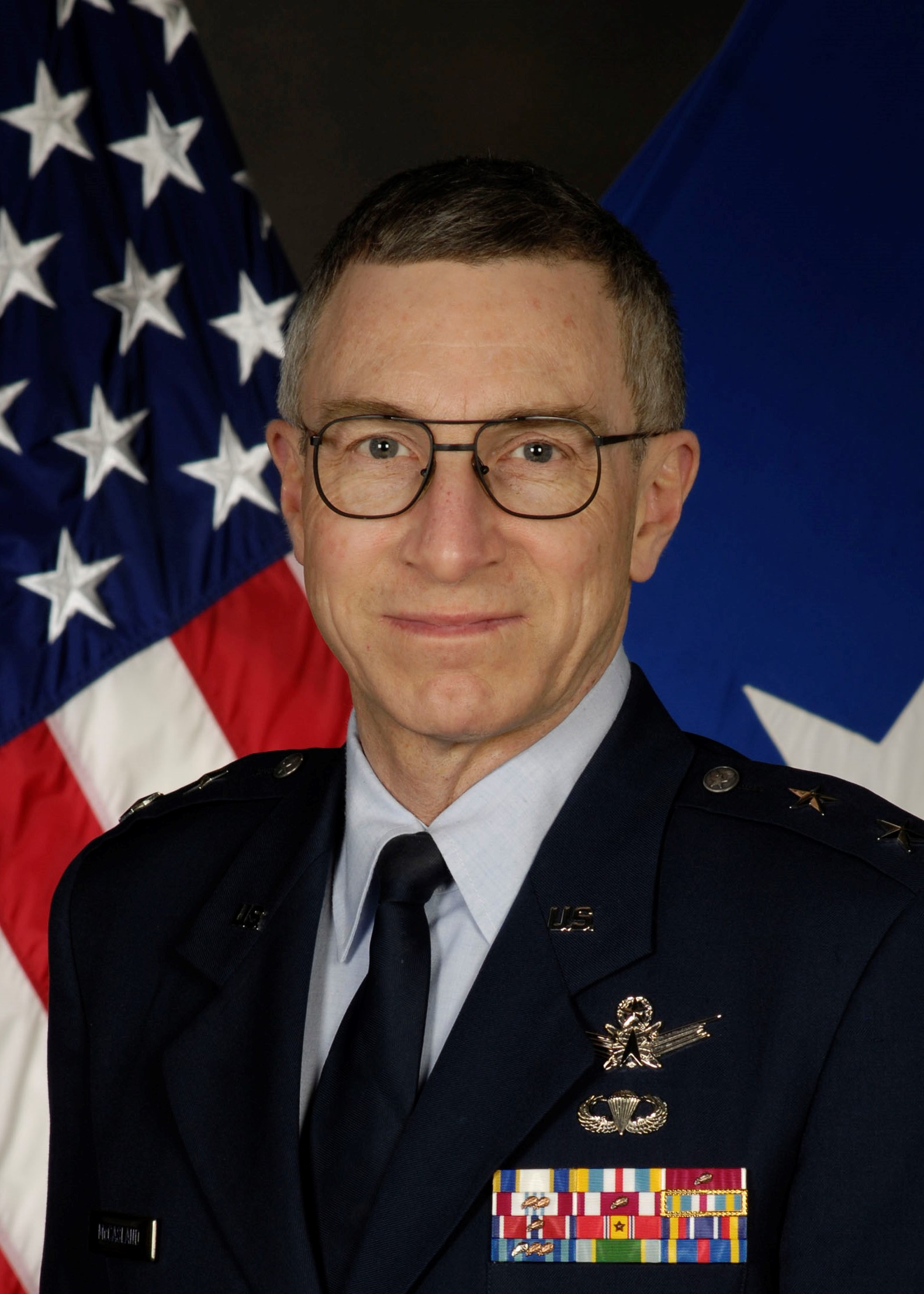
Neil McCasland

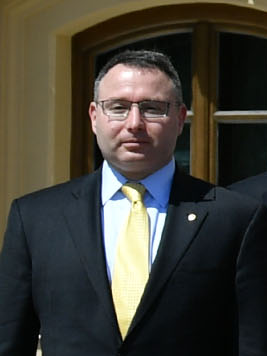
Alexander Vindman

=== US Air Force ===
- Ricardo Aponte, retired brigadier general
- Hal Bidlack, retired lieutenant colonel
- John A. Bradley, retired lieutenant general
- Jonathan D. George, retired brigadier general
- Irv Halter, retired major general
- Randy Jayne, retired major general
- Jan-Marc Jouas, retired lieutenant general
- Neil McCasland, retired major general, commander of the Air Force Research Laboratory (2011–2013)
- Lloyd W. Newton, retired four-star general
- Patricia Rose, retired major general
- Howard D. Stendahl, retired major general, chief of chaplains of the United States Air Force (2012–2015)
- Terry W. Virts, retired NASA astronaut and colonel
- Jack Weinstein, retired lieutenant general
- Daniel P. Woodward, retired brigadier general

=== US Army ===
- James A. Adkins, retired major general, adjutant general of Maryland (2008–2015)
- Donna Feigley Barbisch, retired major general
- Donald M. Campbell Jr., retired lieutenant general
- Wesley Clark, retired four-star general, Supreme Allied Commander Europe (1997–2000), 2004 candidate for the Democratic nomination for president
- Peter Cooke, retired major general
- Michael S. Davison Jr., retired lieutenant general
- John Doesburg, retired major general
- Paul Eaton, retired major general
- Larry R. Ellis, retired four-star general, commander of United States Army Forces Command (2001–2004)
- Mark Hertling, retired lieutenant general
- Ben Hodges, retired lieutenant general
- Thomas Kolditz, retired brigadier general
- Charles D. Luckey, retired lieutenant general
- James McCain, first lieutenant in the Arizona National Guard, son of Republican senator John McCain
- Stanley A. McChrystal, retired four-star general
- Thomas M. Montgomery, retired lieutenant general
- James W. Nuttall, retired major general
- Charles P. Otstott, retired lieutenant general, Deputy Chair of the NATO Military Committee (1990–1992)
- Gale Pollock, retired major general
- Maritza Sáenz Ryan, retired brigadier general
- Ricardo Sanchez, retired lieutenant general
- Ty Seidule, retired brigadier general
- Tammy Smith, retired major general
- Loree Sutton, retired brigadier general
- Antonio Taguba, retired major general
- Robin Umberg, retired brigadier general
- Alexander Vindman, retired lieutenant colonel
- Charles F. Wald, retired four-star general
- Johnnie E. Wilson, retired four-star general
- Peter B. Zwack, retired brigadier general

=== US Army Nurse Corps ===
- Clara Adams-Ender, retired brigadier general, chief of the U.S. Army Nurse Corps (1987–1991)

=== US Coast Guard ===
- William D. Baumgartner, retired rear admiral
- D. Brian Peterman, retired vice admiral
- James A. Watson, retired rear admiral

=== US Marine Corps ===
- William D. Catto, retired major general
- Stephen A. Cheney, retired brigadier general
- Richard D. Hearney, retired four-star general, Assistant Commandant of the Marine Corps (1994–1996)
- Michael R. Lehnert, retired major general
- Amy McGrath, retired lieutenant colonel, Democratic nominee for the 2020 United States Senate election in Kentucky
- Joseph V. Medina, retired brigadier general
- Michael J. Williams, retired four-star general, assistant commandant of the Marine Corps (2000–2002)

=== US Navy ===
- Charles S. Abbot, retired four-star admiral
- Stephen C. Evans, retired rear admiral
- Ken Harbaugh, retired lieutenant
- Samuel J. Locklear, retired four-star admiral
- Ron J. MacLaren, retired rear admiral
- William J. McDaniel, retired rear admiral
- Charles L. Munns, retired vice admiral
- Malcolm Nance, retired senior chief petty officer
- David R. Oliver Jr., retired rear admiral
- Fernandez Ponds, retired rear admiral
- Dwight Shepherd, retired rear admiral
- Steven G. Smith, retired rear admiral
- Robert O. Wray, retired rear admiral

=== US Public Health Service Commissioned Corps ===
- James M. Galloway, retired rear admiral
- Clare Helminiak, retired rear admiral
- Stephen C. Redd, retired rear admiral
- Mark L. Rosenberg, retired rear admiral

== Private enterprises ==
- Ben & Jerry's
- Cards Against Humanity
- Gemini G.E.L.
- Gibney Dance
- Little Gay Pub
- Obey
- Replacements, Ltd. PAC
- Seattle Storm
- Team Love Records
- Vicente LLP

== Labor unions ==
=== National and international ===
- Actors' Equity Association
- AFL-CIO
- Amalgamated Transit Union
- American Federation of Government Employees
- American Federation of Musicians
- American Federation of School Administrators
- American Federation of State, County and Municipal Employees
- American Federation of Teachers
- American Guild of Musical Artists
- American Postal Workers Union
- American Train Dispatchers Association
- Asian Pacific American Labor Alliance
- Association of Flight Attendants
- Association of Professional Flight Attendants
- Association of Theatrical Press Agents & Managers
- Brotherhood of Locomotive Engineers and Trainmen
- Brotherhood of Maintenance of Way Employes
- Brotherhood of Railroad Signalmen
- Coalition of Black Trade Unionists
- Communication Workers of America
- International Alliance of Theatrical Stage Employees
- International Association of Bridge, Structural, Ornamental and Reinforcing Iron Workers
- International Association of Machinists and Aerospace Workers
- International Association of Sheet Metal, Air, Rail and Transportation Workers
- International Brotherhood of Electrical Workers
- International Federation of Professional and Technical Engineers
- International Longshore and Warehouse Union
- International Organization of Masters, Mates & Pilots
- International Union of Bricklayers and Allied Craftworkers
- International Union of Elevator Constructors
- International Union of Operating Engineers
- International Union of Painters and Allied Trades
- Laborers' International Union of North America
- Motion Picture Editors Guild
- National Air Traffic Controllers Association
- National Association of Letter Carriers
- National Education Association
- National Federation of Federal Employees
- National Nurses United
- National Postal Mail Handlers Union
- National Treasury Employees Union
- National Union of Healthcare Workers
- National Weather Service Employees Organization
- North America's Building Trades Unions
- Office and Professional Employees International Union
- Retail, Wholesale and Department Store Union
- Sailors' Union of the Pacific
- Seafarers International Union of North America
- Service Employees International Union
- Stage Directors and Choreographers Society
- UNITE HERE
- United Association
- United Auto Workers
- United Brotherhood of Carpenters and Joiners of America
- United Electrical, Radio and Machine Workers of America
- United Farm Workers
- United Food and Commercial Workers
- United Scenic Artists
- United Steelworkers
- United Union of Roofers, Waterproofers and Allied Workers
- Utility Workers Union of America
- Writers Guild of America West PAC

=== State and local unions ===
AFL-CIO affiliates:

- Arizona AFL-CIO
- Connecticut AFL-CIO
- Florida AFL-CIO
- Hawkeye Area Labor Council
- Kentucky AFL-CIO
- Maine AFL-CIO
- Massachusetts AFL-CIO
- Napa-Solano Central Labor Council
- Nevada AFL-CIO
- New Jersey AFL-CIO
- New York State AFL-CIO
  - New York City Central Labor Council
- Oregon AFL–CIO
- Pennsylvania AFL–CIO
- South Bay Labor Council
- Texas Gulf Coast Area Labor Federation
- Washington State Labor Council
  - King County Labor Council
- Wisconsin AFL-CIO

Amalgamated Transit Union affiliates:

- Local 689

American Association of University Professors affiliates:

- Nevada Faculty Alliance
- Rutgers

American Federation of Government Employees affiliates:

- Council 238

American Federation of State, County and Municipal Employees affiliates:

- AFSCME Council 31
- Council 5
- District Council 37
- District Council 47
- Local 152
- Local 925

American Federation of Musicians affiliates:

- AFM Local 802

American Federation of Teachers affiliates:

- AFT of Maryland
- AFT of Massachusetts
- Chicago Teachers Union
- Cook County College Teachers Union Local 1600
- Ohio Federation of Teachers
- Professional Staff Congress
- Rutgers Adjunct Faculty Union
- United Federation of Teachers New York City, New York
- United Teachers of New Orleans

American Postal Workers Union affiliates:

- California School Employees Association
- Local 72

International Association of Fire Fighters affiliates: (Note: IAFF National declined to endorse anyone in the general election for president.)

- California Professional Firefighters
- Minnesota Professional Fire Fighters

International Brotherhood of Electrical Workers affiliates:

- Local 8
- Local 11
- Local 103
- Local 292
- Local 2325

International Brotherhood of Teamsters affiliates: (Note: Teamsters National declined to endorse anyone in the general election for president.)

- Black Caucus
- Joint Council 7
- Joint Council 13
- Joint Council 25
- Joint Council 28
- Joint Council 32
- Joint Council 39
- Joint Council 40
- Joint Council 42
- Joint Council 43
- Joint Council 55
- Joint Council 62
- Joint Council 75
- Joint Council 94
- Local 79 (Tampa, Florida)
- Local 89 (Louisville, Kentucky)
- Local 104 (Phoenix, Arizona)
- Local 117 (Tukwila, Washington)
- Local 122 (Boston, Massachusetts)
- Local 173 (Bradenton, Florida)
- Local 186 (Ventura, California)
- Local 202 (The Bronx, New York)
- Local 237 (New York City and Suffolk counties, New York)
- Local 238 (Cedar Rapids, Iowa)
- Local 320 (Minneapolis, Minnesota)
- Local 344 (Milwaukee, Wisconsin)
- Local 385 (Orlando, Florida)
- Local 396 (Covina, California)
- Local 455 (Denver, Colorado)
- Local 492 (Albuquerque, New Mexico)
- Local 512 (Jacksonville, Florida)
- Local 528 (Jonesboro, Georgia)
- Local 572 (Carson, California)
- Local 623 (Philadelphia, Pennsylvania)
- Local 630 (Los Angeles, California)
- Local 688 (St Louis, Missouri)
- Local 705 (Chicago, Illinois)
- Local 727 (Park Ridge, Illinois)
- Local 728 (Atlanta, Georgia)
- Local 743 (Chicago, Illinois)
- Local 769 (North Miami, Florida)
- Local 792 (Minneapolis, Minnesota)
- Local 848 (Glendora, California)
- Local 947 (Jacksonville, Florida)
- Local 986 (Covina, California)
- Local 988 (Houston, Texas)
- Local 1129 (White, Georgia)
- Missouri-Kansas-Nebraska Conference
- Pennsylvania Conference
- Rail Conference

International Union of Operating Engineers affiliates:

- Local 150

National Education Association affiliates:

- Colorado Education Association
- Michigan Education Association
- New Jersey Education Association
- NEA New Mexico
- Ohio Education Association
- Oregon Education Association
- Texas State Teachers Association
- Wisconsin Education Association Council

National Nurses United affiliates:

- Orange County Labor Federation
- Washington State Nurses Association

Service Employees International Union affiliates:

- 1199SEIU United Healthcare Workers East
- California State University Employees Union
- Local 221
- Local 500
- Local 521
- Local 721
- Local 1021
- Oregon State Council
- SEIU CALIFORNIA
- SEIU Minnesota council
- SEIU Pennsylvania council
- SEIU United Healthcare Workers West

UNITE HERE affiliates:

- Culinary Workers Union
- Local 11

United Food and Commercial Workers affiliates:

- Local 99
- Local 324
- UFCW 880
- UFCW 3000
- UFCW Local 1776

== Newspapers and other publications ==
- Addison County Independent
- The Advocate
- The Atlantic
- Baltimore Jewish Times
- Bay Area Reporter
- Bay Windows
- The Berkshire Eagle
- The Boston Globe
- Boston Irish
- BuzzFeed
- The Capital Times
- The Charlotte Observer
- The Charlotte Post
- Daily Herald
- Daily Kos
- The Daily Pennsylvanian
- The Denver Post
- The Dominion Post
- The Economist
- El Nuevo Día
- The Everett Herald
- Falls Church News-Press
- The Gazette
- The Gleaner
- The Guardian
- Honolulu Star-Advertiser
- Houston Chronicle
- Hullabaloo Views
- Irish Independent
- Kazoo
- Las Vegas Sun
- Las Vegas Weekly
- Le Monde
- Los Angeles Sentinel
- Marquette Wire
- The Michigan Daily
- The Nation
- New Pittsburgh Courier
- The New York Times
- The New Yorker
- The News & Observer
- OB Rag
- The Oregonian
- Palmer Report
- The Philadelphia Inquirer
- The Plain Dealer
- The Post-Standard
- The Republican
- Rolling Stone
- San Antonio Express-News
- San Francisco Bay Guardian
- Santa Barbara Independent
- Savannah Tribune
- Scientific American
- Seattle Gay News
- The Seattle Times
- The Shepherd Express
- The Source
- The Star-Ledger
- Storm Lake Times
- The Sun Chronicle
- Tennessee Tribune
- Times of Malta
- Vogue
- The Washington Informer
- Washington Jewish Week
- Winston-Salem Chronicle
- Wisconsin State Journal
- Word in Black (Note: Word In Black, a collaborative of 10 historically black newspaper publications, endorsed Kamala Harris, and ran an editorial in all of their papers.)
  - The Atlanta Voice
  - Baltimore Afro-American
  - The Dallas Weekly
  - Houston Defender
  - Michigan Chronicle
  - New York Amsterdam News
  - The Sacramento Observer
  - Seattle Medium
  - The St. Louis American
  - The Washington Informer
- xkcd

== Academics ==
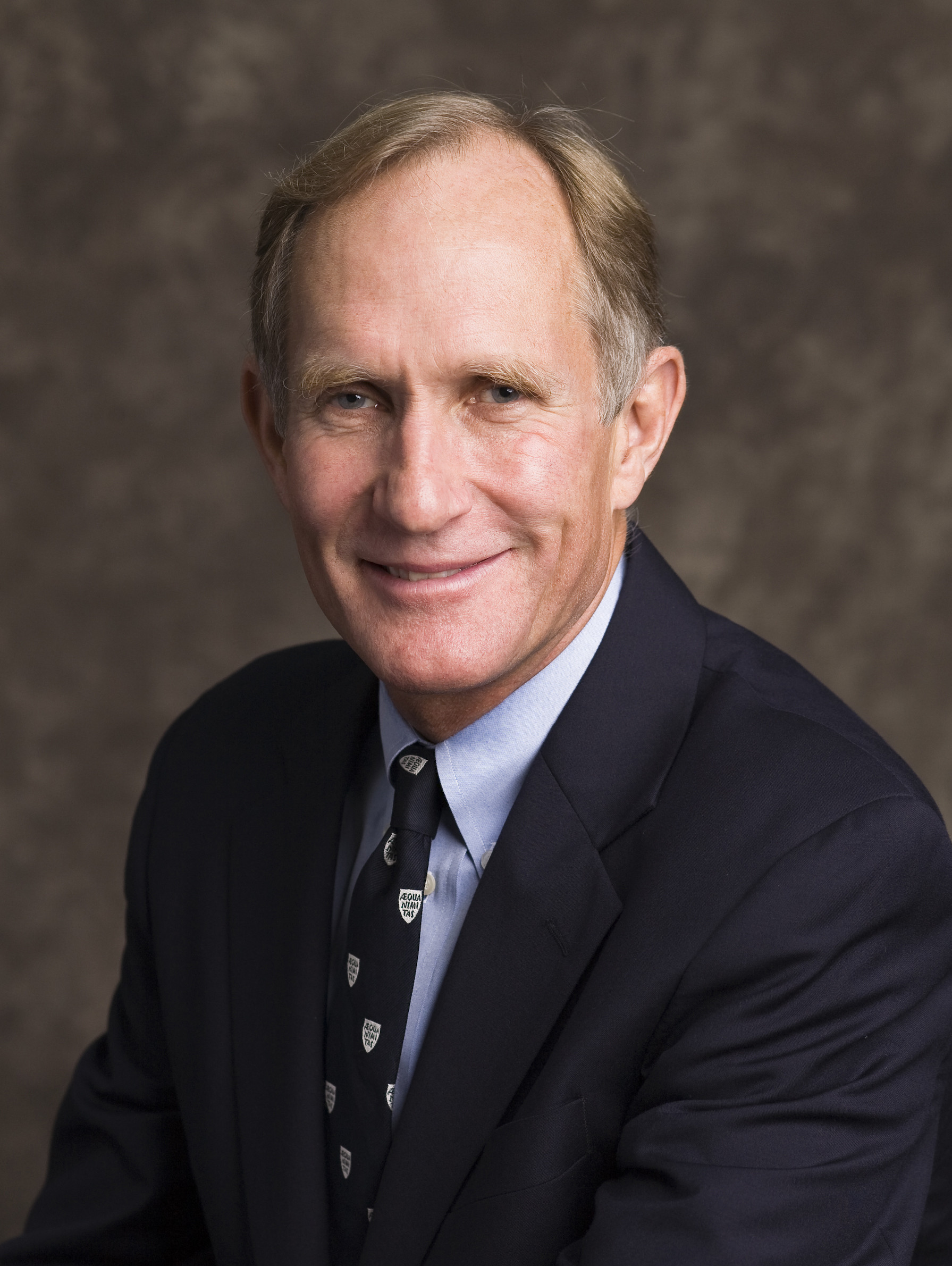
Peter Agre

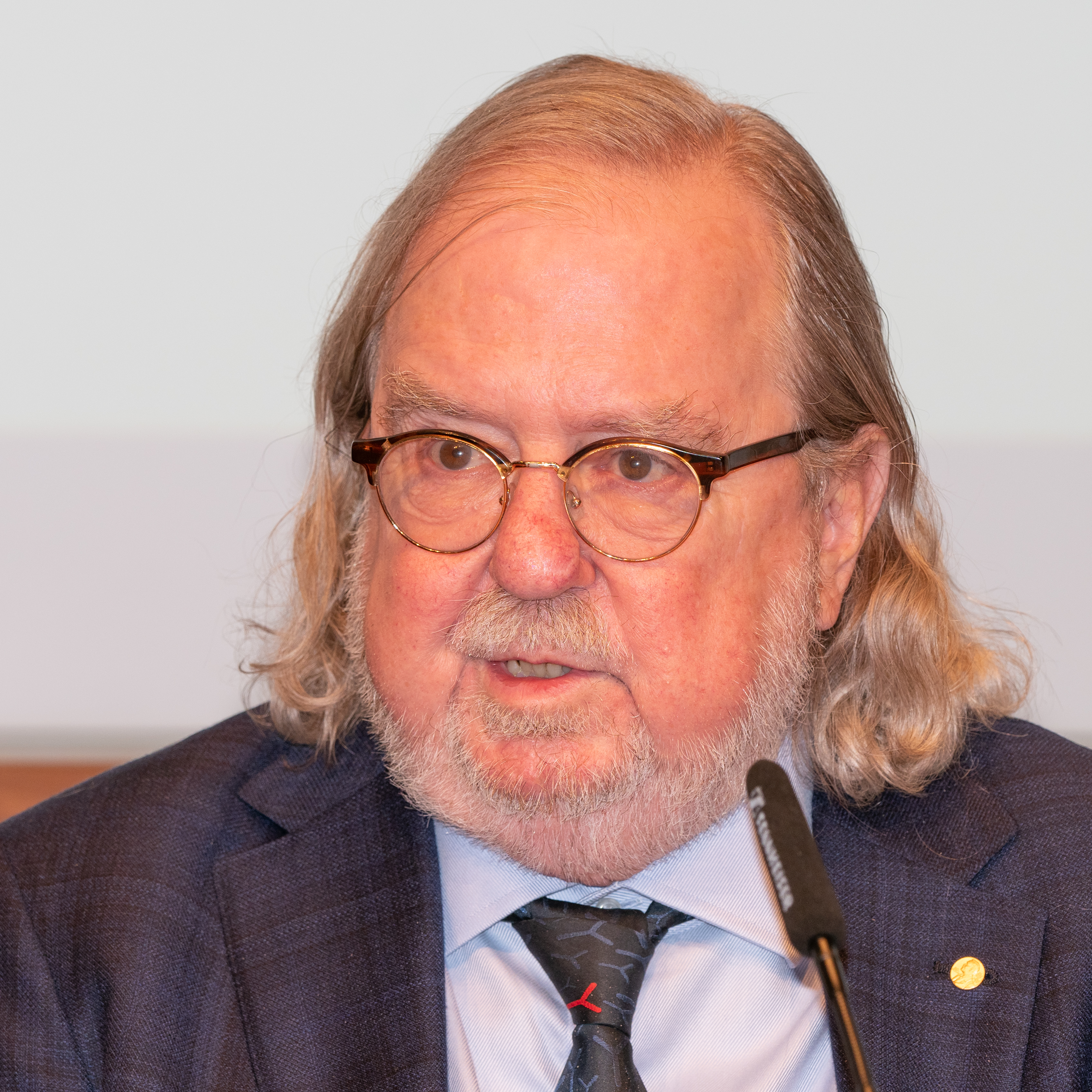
James P. Allison

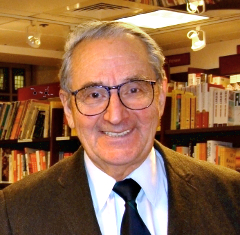
Elias James Corey

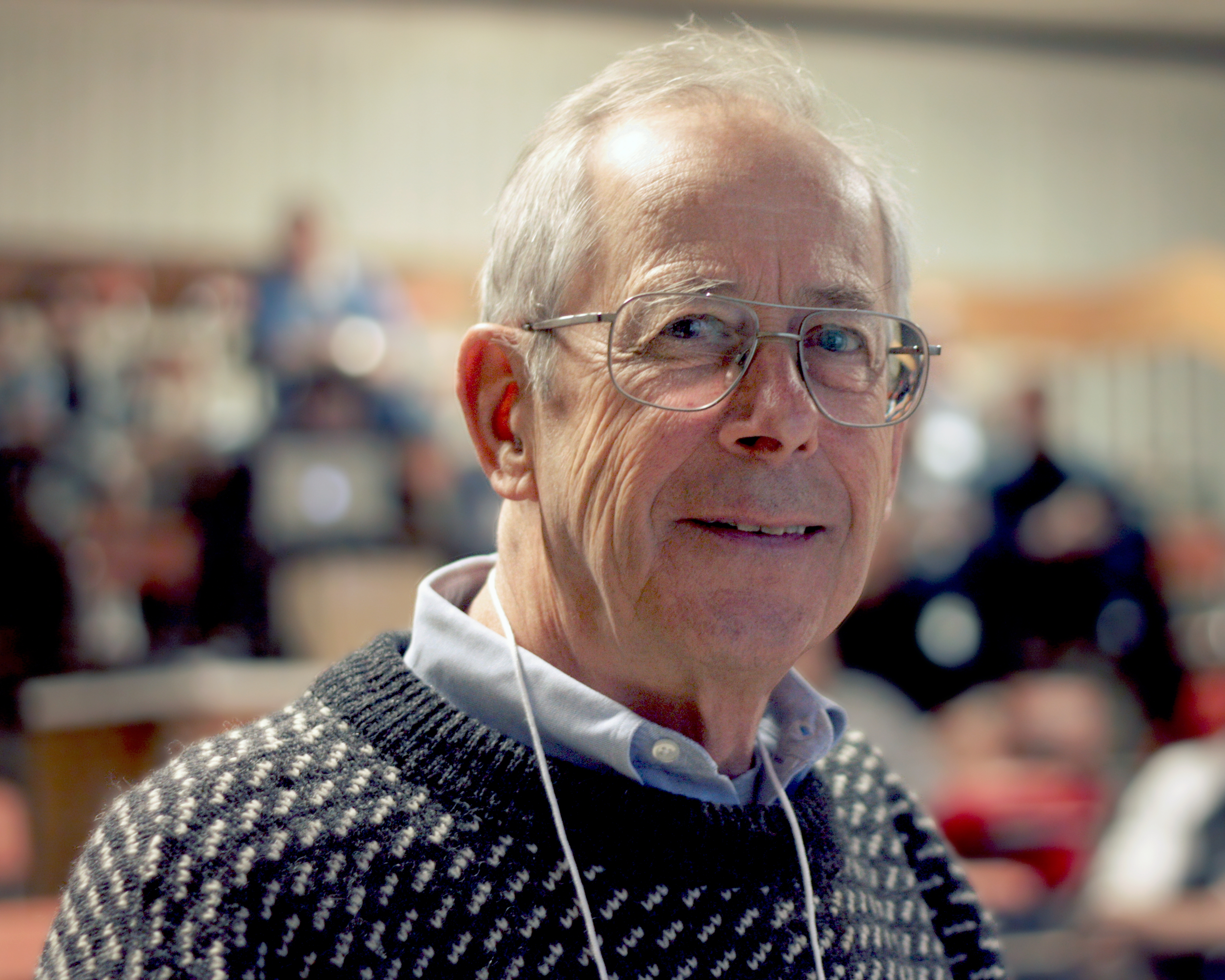
Jim Peebles

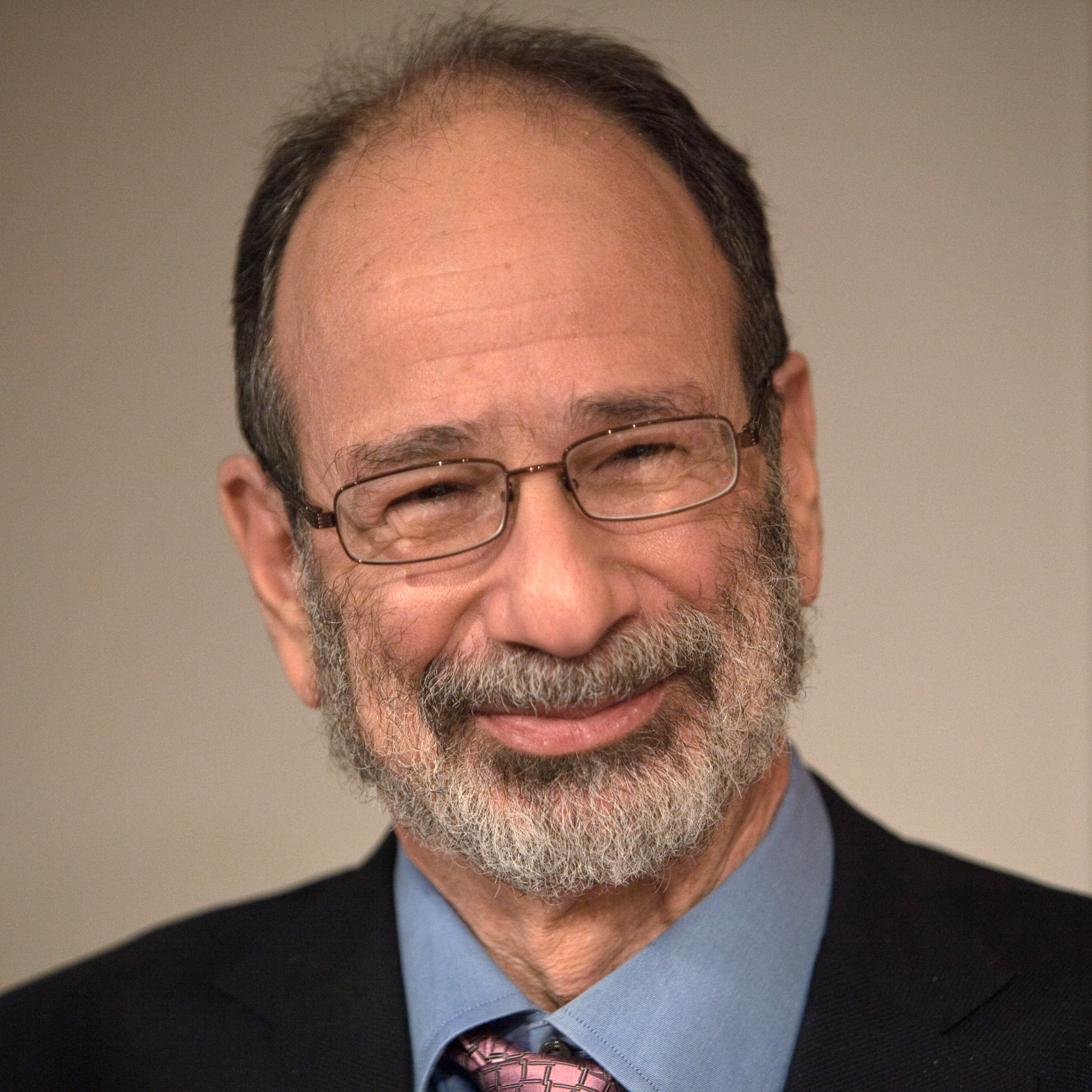
Alvin E. Roth

- Daron Acemoglu, economist, professor of Economics at the Massachusetts Institute of Technology, 2005 recipient of the John Bates Clark Medal, recipient of the Nobel Memorial Prize in Economic Sciences in 2024
- Peter Agre, physician and molecular biologist, Bloomberg Distinguished Professor at the Johns Hopkins Bloomberg School of Public Health and Johns Hopkins School of Medicine, director of the Johns Hopkins Malaria Research Institute, recipient of the Nobel Prize in Chemistry in 2003
- Basheer Ahmed, physician
- George Akerlof, economist, professor at the McCourt School of Public Policy at Georgetown University, Koshland Professor of Economics Emeritus at the University of California, Berkeley, recipient of the Nobel Memorial Prize in Economic Sciences in 2001
- Randy Albelda, feminist economist, professor emerita of economics at the University of Massachusetts Boston
- James P. Allison, immunologist, professor and chair of immunology, executive director of the immunotherapy platform, and Regental Professor and founding director of the James P. Allison Institute at the MD Anderson Cancer Center, recipient of the Nobel Prize in Physiology or Medicine in 2018
- Rebecca Alpert, professor of Religion Emerita at Temple University
- Harvey J. Alter, virologist and physician, associate director for research of the Department of Transfusion Medicine at the Warren Grant Magnuson Clinical Center, recipient of the Nobel Prize in Physiology or Medicine in 2020
- Tyler Anbinder, historian, professor emeritus at George Washington University
- Fred Anderson, historian of early North American history, professor emeritus of History at the University of Colorado Boulder
- Margaret L. Anderson, historian, professor emerita at University of California Berkeley
- Margo J. Anderson, social historian and historian of statistics, distinguished professor of history at the University of Wisconsin–Milwaukee
- Virginia DeJohn Anderson, historian, professor of history at the University of Colorado Boulder
- Donald Andrews, Canadian economist, professor of Economics at the Cowles Foundation
- Frances Arnold, chemical engineer, Linus Pauling Professor of Chemical Engineering, Bioengineering and Biochemistry at the California Institute of Technology, recipient of the Nobel Prize in Chemistry in 2018
- Jabari Asim, writer, Distinguished Professor of Multidisciplinary Letters at Emerson College
- Susan Athey, economist, Economics of Technology Professor in the School of Humanities and Sciences at the Stanford Graduate School of Business
- Maximilian Auffhammer, environmental economist, associate professor at the University of California, Berkeley
- Arlene Voski Avakian, scholar of women's studies and food history, professor emeritus at the University of Massachusetts Amherst
- Lee Badgett, economist, professor at the University of Massachusetts Amherst, research director at the Williams Institute
- David Baker, biochemist and computational biologist, Henrietta and Aubrey Davis Endowed Professor in Biochemistry, an investigator with the Howard Hughes Medical Institute, and an adjunct professor of genome sciences, bioengineering, chemical engineering, computer science, and physics at the University of Washington, recipient of the Nobel Prize in Chemistry in 2024
- Dean Baker, macroeconomist, co-founder of the Center for Economic and Policy Research
- David Baltimore, biologist, professor of biology and former president of the California Institute of Technology, former president of Rockefeller University, recipient of the Nobel Prize in Physiology or Medicine in 1975
- Abhijit Banerjee, Indian-American economist, Ford Foundation International Professor of Economics at the Massachusetts Institute of Technology, co-founder and co-director of the Abdul Latif Jameel Poverty Action Lab, recipient of the Nobel Memorial Prize in Economic Sciences in 2019
- Nina Banks, economist, associate professor of economics at Bucknell University, former president of the National Economic Association
- James M. Banner Jr., historian, member of the Society of American Historians
- Barry Barish, experimental physicist, Linde Professor of Physics emeritus at the California Institute of Technology, recipient of the Nobel Prize in Physics in 2017
- Christopher B. Barrett, agricultural and development economist, professor of Applied Economics and Management and International Professor of Agriculture at Cornell University's Charles H. Dyson School of Applied Economics and Management
- Bruce Bartlett, historian, member of the American Economic Association and the Committee for Monetary Research and Education (Independent)
- Diana Butler Bass, historian of Christianity and author
- Moungi Bawendi, American–Tunisian–French chemist, Lester Wolfe Professor at the Massachusetts Institute of Technology, recipient of the Nobel Prize in Chemistry in 2023
- Marc Becker, professor of Latin American Studies at Truman State University
- David A. Bell, historian of French history, professor at Princeton University
- Christopher Benfey, literary critic and Emily Dickinson scholar, Mellon Professor of English at Mount Holyoke College
- Bruce L. Benson, economist, chair of the department of economics, DeVoe L. Moore Professor, distinguished research professor and courtesy professor of law at Florida State University
- Dirk Bergemann, economist, professor of Economics and Computer Science at Yale University
- Iris Berger, historian of Africa, professor at the University at Albany, SUNY
- Eugenie L. Birch, Professor of Urban Research and Education and the chair of the Graduate Group in City and Regional Planning at the University of Pennsylvania
- J. Michael Bishop, immunologist and microbiologist, director of the Bishop Lab at the University of California, San Francisco, recipient of the Nobel Prize in Physiology or Medicine in 1989
- Elizabeth Blackburn, Australian-American molecular biologist, professor emeritus at the University of California, San Francisco, former president of the Salk Institute for Biological Studies, recipient of the Nobel Prize in Physiology or Medicine in 2009
- Keisha N. Blain, scholar of African American history, African Diaspora Studies, and Women's and Gender History, professor of Africana Studies and History at Brown University
- Robert A. Blecker, economist, professor at American University
- David W. Blight, historian, Sterling Professor of History, of African American Studies, and of American Studies and Director of the Gilder Lehrman Center for the Study of Slavery, Resistance, and Abolition at Yale University
- Barry Bluestone, professor of Political Economy, founding director of the Kitty and Michael Dukakis Center for Urban and Regional Policy, and the founding dean of the School of Public Policy & Urban Affairs at Northeastern University
- Lawrence E. Blume, Distinguished Arts and Sciences Professor of Economics and Professor of Information Science at Cornell University
- John B. Boles, historian, William P. Hobby Professor of American History emeritus at Rice University
- Jason Bordoff, energy policy expert
- Jennifer Finney Boylan, writer, professor of English and Anna Quindlen Writer-in-Residence at Barnard College
- Holly Brewer, legal historian, Burke Professor of American History and associate professor of history at the University of Maryland, College Park
- Xavier Briggs, social scientist, senior fellow at the Brookings Institution
- Robert K. Brigham, historian, Shirley Ecker Boskey Professor of History and International Relations at Vassar College
- Douglas Brinkley, historian, Katherine Tsanoff Brown Chair in Humanities, and professor of history at Rice University
- Rosa Brooks, law professor, journalist, and author
- Claire V. Broome, epidemiologist
- Kathleen M. Brown, historian, David Boies Professor of History at the University of Pennsylvania
- Michael Stuart Brown, geneticist, W. A. Moncrief Distinguished Chair in Cholesterol and Arteriosclerosis Research at the University of Texas Southwestern Medical Center, recipient of the Nobel Prize in Physiology or Medicine in 1985
- Mari Jo Buhle, historian, William J. Kenan Jr. University Professor Emerita at Brown University
- Alafair Burke, writer, professor of Law at the Hofstra University School of Law
- Vernon Burton, historian, professor of history at Clemson University, director of the Clemson CyberInstitute
- Anthea Butler, professor of religion, professor in American Social Thought and chair of the University of Pennsylvania Department of Religious Studies
- Jon Butler, historian, Howard R. Lamar Professor Emeritus of American Studies, History, and Religious Studies at Yale University
- Albert Camarillo, historian, Leon Sloss Jr. Memorial Professor, emeritus, in the department of history at Stanford University
- Mario Capecchi, Italian-American molecular geneticist, Distinguished Professor of Human Genetics and Biology at the University of Utah School of Medicine, recipient of the Nobel Prize in Physiology or Medicine in 2007
- Martin Carnoy, labour economist, professor of Education at the Stanford Graduate School of Education
- Christine K. Cassel, expert in geriatric medicine, medical ethics and quality of care, Dean of the Kaiser Permanente Bernard J. Tyson School of Medicine
- Eric Chaisson, astrophysicist, member of the Harvard–Smithsonian Center for Astrophysics
- Martin Chalfie, neurobiologist, University Professor in the department of biology at Columbia University, recipient of the Nobel Prize in Chemistry in 2008
- Marisa Chappell, historian, associate professor at Oregon State University
- Judith Chevalier, economist, professor of Finance and Economics at Yale University, fellow at the Econometric Society
- Joseph Cirincione, national security analyst and former president of Ploughshares Fund
- Catherine Clinton, historian, Denman Professor of American History at the University of Texas at San Antonio
- Alexis Coe, presidential historian, senior fellow at New America
- Johnnetta Cole, anthropologist
- Pamela Cooper-White, professor emerita and dean emerita of Psychology and Religion at Union Theological Seminary
- José F. Cordero, pediatrician, epidemiologist, and teratologist, head of the department of Epidemiology and Biostatistics at the University of Georgia College of Public Health
- Elias James Corey, organic chemist, emeritus professor of organic chemistry at Harvard University, recipient of the Nobel Prize in Chemistry in 1990
- Ruth Schwartz Cowan, historian of science, technology, and medicine, professor emerita at the University of Pennsylvania
- Karen L. Cox, historian of Southern history, professor at the University of North Carolina at Charlotte
- Vincent Crawford, economist, senior research fellow at the University of Oxford
- Margaret Creighton, historian, professor emerita at Bates College
- Martin C. Dean, historian, research scholar at the Center for Advanced Holocaust Studies
- Angus Deaton, British-American economist, senior scholar and the Dwight D. Eisenhower Professor of Economics and International Affairs Emeritus at the Princeton School of Public and International Affairs and the Economics Department at Princeton University, recipient of the Nobel Memorial Prize in Economic Sciences in 2015
- Carmen Diana Deere, feminist economist, professor emerita of Latin American studies and Food Resources Economics at the University of Florida, professor emerita of the Latin American Faculty of Social Sciences
- Johann Deisenhofer, German biochemist, professor at the Department of Biophysics at the University of Texas Southwestern Medical Center, member of the Scientists and Engineers for America board of advisors, recipient of the Nobel Prize in Chemistry in 1988
- James Bradford DeLong, economic historian, professor of economics at the University of California, Berkeley
- Douglas Diamond, economist, Merton H. Miller Distinguished Service Professor of Finance at the University of Chicago Booth School of Business, recipient of the Nobel Memorial Prize in Economic Sciences in 2022
- Peter Diamond, economist, Institute Professor at the Massachusetts Institute of Technology, recipient of the Nobel Memorial Prize in Economic Sciences in 2010
- Hasia Diner, historian, Paul S. and Sylvia Steinberg Professor of American Jewish History, professor of Hebrew and Judaic Studies, History, and Director of the Goldstein-Goren Center for American Jewish History at New York University
- Peter Doherty, Australian immunologist, National Trust Australian Living Treasure, recipient of the Nobel Prize in Physiology or Medicine in 1996
- Jim Downs, historian, Gilder Lehrman-National Endowment for the Humanities Professor of Civil War Studies and History at Gettysburg College
- Don H. Doyle, historian, professor emeritus of History at the University of South Carolina
- Thomas Dublin, social historian, Distinguished Professor of History at Binghamton University
- Esther Duflo, French-American economist, Abdul Latif Jameel Professor of Poverty Alleviation and Development Economics at the Massachusetts Institute of Technology, recipient of the Nobel Memorial Prize in Economic Sciences in 2019
- Mark Duggan, economist, professor of Economics at Stanford University, former director of the Stanford Institute for Economic Policy Research
- Kathleen DuVal, historian, professor of history at the University of North Carolina at Chapel Hill
- Jonathan H. Earle, historian, Dean of the Roger Hadfield Ogden Honors College at Louisiana State University
- Elizabeth Economy, political scientist, senior fellow at the Hoover Institution at Stanford University
- Richard Edwards, economist, professor emeritus at the University of Nebraska–Lincoln
- Robert F. Engle, economist and statistician, recipient of the Nobel Memorial Prize in Economic Sciences in 2003
- Ann Fabian, historian, Distinguished Professor Emeritus of History at Rutgers University
- Melissa Febos, writer, professor of the Nonfiction Writing Program at the University of Iowa
- Dana R. Fisher, sociologist, professor, director of the Center for Environment, Community and Equity at American University
- Lisa K. Fitzpatrick, epidemiologist and public health expert, lecturer at the George Washington University School of Medicine & Health Sciences
- Maria Floro, economist, professor emerita of Economics at American University
- Catherine Coleman Flowers, environmental health researcher
- Eric Foner, historian, professor at the Columbia University Department of History
- Amanda Foreman, biographer and historian, Research Senior Fellow in the History Department at the University of Liverpool
- Joachim Frank, German-American biophysicist, professor of Biochemistry and Molecular Biophysics and of biological sciences at Columbia University, recipient of the Nobel Prize in Chemistry in 2017
- Jeffrey Frankel, international macroeconomist, professor of Capital Formation and Growth at Harvard Kennedy School
- Paul Freedman, historian and medievalist, Chester D. Tripp Professor of History at Yale University
- Gerald Friedman, economist, economics professor at the University of Massachusetts Amherst
- Jerome Isaac Friedman, physicist, institute professor and professor of physics emeritus at the Massachusetts Institute of Technology, recipient of the Nobel Prize in Physics in 1990
- Beverly Gage, historian, professor of history and American studies at Yale University
- Kevin K. Gaines, historian, Julian Bond Professor of Civil Rights and Social Justice and a professor of African American history at the University of Virginia
- Marcia Gallo, historian, professor emerita at the University of Nevada, Las Vegas
- Scott Galloway, public speaker, of marketing at the New York University Stern School of Business
- Jerry Gershenhorn, historian, Julius L. Chambers Professor of American History at North Carolina Central University
- Richard Gilbert, economist, Distinguished Professor Emeritus of Economics at the University of California at Berkeley
- Al Gillespie, New Zealand legal academic, pro vice-chancellor for research and professor of law, specializing in international law related to war, the environment and civil liberties, at the University of Waikato
- Donna Ginther, economist, Distinguished Professor of economics and the director of the Institute for Policy and Social Research at the University of Kansas
- Sheldon Glashow, theoretical physicist, Metcalf Professor of Mathematics and Physics at Boston University, Eugene Higgins Professor of Physics emeritus at Harvard University, recipient of the Nobel Prize in Physics in 1979
- Eddie Glaude, historian, James S. McDonnell Distinguished University Professor of African American Studies at Princeton University
- Glenda Glover, president of Tennessee State University (2013–2024)
- Claudia Goldin, economic historian labor economist, professor of Economics at Harvard University, 2023 recipient of the Nobel Memorial Prize in Economic Sciences
- Joseph L. Goldstein, biochemist, chair of Molecular Genetics at the University of Texas Southwestern Medical Center, recipient of the Nobel Prize in Physiology or Medicine in 1985
- Melvin Goodman, national security and intelligence expert, adjunct professor at Johns Hopkins University
- Robert J. Gordon, economist, professor of the Social Sciences at Northwestern University
- Sarah Barringer Gordon, historian, Arlin M. Adams Professor of Constitutional Law and a professor of history at the University of Pennsylvania
- Elizabeth Graver, writer, professor of English and Creative Writing at Boston College
- David Greenberg, historian, professor of US history, journalism, and media studies at Rutgers University
- Christina Greer, political scientist, researcher of U.S. politics, black ethnic politics, urban politics, and public opinion, professor of political science at Fordham University
- Jerry Green, economist, professor of Political Economy at Harvard University
- Carol W. Greider, molecular biologist, Distinguished Professor in the department of molecular, cell, and developmental biology at the University of California, Santa Cruz, recipient of the Nobel Prize in Physiology or Medicine in 2009
- Thomas Groome, theologian, professor in theology and religious education at Boston College
- Ariela Gross, historian, Distinguished Professor of Law at the UCLA School of Law
- David Gross, theoretical physicist and string theorist, Chancellor's Chair Professor of Theoretical Physics at the Kavli Institute for Theoretical Physics of the University of California, Santa Barbara, recipient of the Nobel Prize in Physics in 2004
- James Grossman, historian, executive director of the American Historical Association
- A. Tom Grunfeld, Canadian sinologist, SUNY professor of history at Empire State College
- Beverly Guy-Sheftall, Black feminist scholar, Anna Julia Cooper Professor of Women's Studies and English at Spelman College
- Jacob Hacker, political scientist, director of the Institution for Social and Policy Studies and a professor of political science at Yale University
- William W. Hagen, historian, professor of history at the University of California-Davis
- Kristine Haglund, author and historian
- Jeffrey C. Hall, geneticist and chronobiologist, professor emeritus of Biology at Brandeis University, recipient of the Nobel Prize in Physiology or Medicine in 2017
- Oliver Hart, British-American economist, Lewis P. and Linda L. Geyser University Professor at Harvard University, recipient of the Nobel Memorial Prize in Economic Sciences in 2016
- Sam Harris, American philosopher, neuroscientist, author, and podcast host
- Heidi Hartmann, feminist economist, founder and president emerita of the Institute for Women's Policy Research
- Leland H. Hartwell, biologist, former president and director of the Fred Hutchinson Cancer Research Center, Virginia G. Piper Chair of Personalized Medicine and co-director of the Biodesign Institute's Center for Sustainable Health at Arizona State University, recipient of the Nobel Prize in Physiology or Medicine in 2001
- Alan J. Heeger, physicist, member of the National Academy of Engineering, recipient of the Nobel Prize in Chemistry in 2000
- Susan Helper, economist, professor of Economics at the Weatherhead School of Management
- Gail Hershatter, historian of Modern China, Distinguished Professor of History chair at the University of California, Santa Cruz
- Nancy A. Hewitt, historian, professor emeritus at Rutgers University
- Anita Hill, professor of social policy, law, and women's studies at Brandeis University
- Martha Hodes, historian, professor of history at New York University
- Graham Russell Gao Hodges, George Dorland Langdon Jr. Professor of History and Africana & Latin American Studies at Colgate University
- Roald Hoffmann, Polish-American theoretical chemist, Frank H. T. Rhodes Professor of Humane Letters Emeritus at Cornell University, recipient of the Nobel Prize in Chemistry in 1981
- David Hollinger, historian, Preston Hotchkis Professor of History, emeritus at the University of California, Berkeley
- Harold Holzer, scholar of Abraham Lincoln, director of the Roosevelt House Public Policy Institute at Hunter College
- Harry J. Holzer, economist, professor of Public Policy at the McCourt School of Public Policy, fellow at the American Institutes for Research
- John Hopfield, physicist, Howard A. Prior Professor of Molecular Biology emeritus at Princeton University, recipient of the Nobel Prize in Physics in 2024
- H. Robert Horvitz, biologist, professor of Biology and a member of the McGovern Institute for Brain Research at the Massachusetts Institute of Technology, recipient of the Nobel Prize in Physiology or Medicine in 2002
- Ellen Hughes-Cromwick, economist, senior economist at the University of Michigan Energy Institute
- David Henry Hwang, playwright, librettist, screenwriter, and theater professor at Columbia University
- Hussein Ibish, Senior Resident Scholar at The Arab Gulf States Institute
- Louis Ignarro, pharmacologist, professor emeritus of pharmacology at the UCLA School of Medicine's department of molecular and medical pharmacology, recipient of the Nobel Prize in Physiology or Medicine in 1998
- Guido Imbens, Dutch-American economist, Applied Econometrics Professor in Economics at the Stanford Graduate School of Business, recipient of the Nobel Memorial Prize in Economic Sciences in 2021
- Charles Ingrao, historian, professor of history at Purdue University
- Maurice Isserman, historian, professor of History at Hamilton College
- Joyce P. Jacobsen, former president of Hobart and William Smith Colleges (2019–2022)
- Matthew Frye Jacobson, historian, Sterling Professor of American Studies and History and Professor of African American Studies at Yale University
- Michael F. Jacobson, microbiologist, co-founder of the Center for Science in the Public Interest
- Sanford M. Jacoby, economic historian and labor economist, Distinguished Research Professor of Management, History, and Public Policy at University of California, Los Angeles
- Russell Jeung, sociologist, co-founder of Stop AAPI Hate
- Ayana Elizabeth Johnson, marine biologist, co-founder of Urban Ocean Lab
- Simon Johnson, British-American economist, Ronald A. Kurtz Professor of Entrepreneurship at the MIT Sloan School of Management, former chief economist of the International Monetary Fund, recipient of the Nobel Memorial Prize in Economic Sciences in 2024
- Chris Jones, nuclear engineer and former executive director of the Arkansas Regional Innovation Hub, Democratic nominee for the 2022 Arkansas gubernatorial election
- Tayari Jones, writer, professor of Creative Writing at Emory University
- Peniel E. Joseph, historian, professor at the LBJ School of Public Affairs and the History Department in at the University of Texas at Austin
- Isaac Julien, artist, Distinguished Professor of the Arts at the University of California, Santa Cruz
- Douglas Kamerow, professor of family medicine at Georgetown University
- Lawrence F. Katz, economist, professor of Economics at Harvard University, research associate of the National Bureau of Economic Research
- Harvey J. Kaye, historian and sociologist, professor emeritus of Democracy & Justice Studies and director of the Center for History and Social Change at the University of Wisconsin–Green Bay
- Michael Kazin, historian, professor at Georgetown University
- Stephanie Kelton, heterodox economist, professor at Stony Brook University, senior fellow at the Schwartz Center for Economic Policy Analysis at The New School for Social Research
- Linda K. Kerber, feminist, political, and intellectual historian, May Brodbeck Professor in Liberal Arts & Sciences at the University of Iowa
- Wolfgang Ketterle, German physicist, professor of physics at the Massachusetts Institute of Technology, recipient of the Nobel Prize in Physics in 2001
- Robin Wall Kimmerer, botanist, director of the Center for Native Peoples and the Environment at the State University of New York College of Environmental Science and Forestry
- Valerie Kinloch, President of Johnson C. Smith University
- Jennifer Klein, historian, professor of 20th-century U.S. history at Yale University
- Bobbie Knight, president of Miles College (2019–president)
- Brian Kobilka, physiologist, professor in the department of Molecular and Cellular Physiology at the Stanford University School of Medicine, recipient of the Nobel Prize in Chemistry in 2012
- Susan Koch, nuclear reduction expert
- Peter Kolchin, historian of slavery and labor in the American South, professor at the University of Delaware
- Roger D. Kornberg, biochemist, professor of structural biology at Stanford University School of Medicine, recipient of the Nobel Prize in Chemistry in 2006
- Peter Kornbluh, historian, senior analyst at the National Security Archive
- J. Morgan Kousser, historian, professor of history and social sciences at the California Institute of Technology
- Stamatios Krimigis, applied physicist, Head Emeritus of the Space Department at the Johns Hopkins Applied Physics Laboratory, namesake of the 8323 Krimigis asteroid
- Mordecai Kurz, economist, professor of Economics, emeritus at Stanford University
- Naomi Lamoreaux, economic historian, Stanley B. Resor Professor of Economics and History at Yale University
- Daniel Landes, former director of the Pardes Institute of Jewish Studies
- Mary Beth Landrum, statistician, professor in the Department of Health Care Policy of the Harvard Medical School
- Steven F. Lawson, historian of the Civil Rights Movement, emeritus professor at Rutgers University–New Brunswick
- William Lazonick, economist, professor at the University of Massachusetts Lowell
- Judith Walzer Leavitt, historian, professor emerita, Rupple Bascom and Ruth Bleier Professor of History of Medicine, History of Science, and Women's Studies at the University of Wisconsin–Madison
- Melvyn P. Leffler, historian, Edward Stettinius Professor of History at the University of Virginia
- Robert Lefkowitz, physician and biochemist, Investigator with the Howard Hughes Medical Institute, James B. Duke Professor of Medicine and Professor of Biochemistry and Chemistry at Duke University, recipient of the Nobel Prize in Chemistry in 2012
- Anthony James Leggett, British–American theoretical physicist, chief scientist at the Institute for Condensed Matter Theory at the University of Illinois Urbana-Champaign, recipient of the Nobel Prize in Physics in 2003
- Hayne Leland, economist, professor emeritus at the University of California, Berkeley
- Bill J. Leonard, historian of religion, professor of Divinity Emeritus at Wake Forest University School of Divinity
- Elizabeth D. Leonard, historian, John J. and Cornelia V. Gibson Professor of History at Colby College
- Kendra Preston Leonard, musicologist, recipient of the Judith Tick Fellowship from the Society for American Music
- William Leuchtenburg, historian of Franklin Delano Roosevelt, William Rand Kenan Jr. Professor Emeritus of History at the University of North Carolina at Chapel Hill
- Henry Levin, education economist, professor of Economics and Education at Columbia University's Teachers College
- David M. Levinson, civil engineer and transportation analyst, professor at the University of Sydney
- Marc Levinson, historian, economist, former senior fellow for international business at the Council on Foreign Relations
- Michael Levitt, South African-American biophysicist, professor of structural biology at Stanford University, recipient of the Nobel Prize in Chemistry in 2013
- David Levering Lewis, historian, Julius Silver University Professor and professor emeritus of history at New York University
- Leah Litman, professor of law at the University of Michigan Law School, co-host of Strict Scrutiny
- Susanna Loeb, economist, director of the Annenberg Institute at Brown University
- Fredrik Logevall, Swedish-American historian, Laurence D. Belfer Professor of International Affairs at the John F. Kennedy School of Government and professor of history in the Harvard Faculty of Arts and Sciences at Harvard University
- Fernando Lozano, labor economist, professor of Economics at Pomona College
- Nora Lustig, economist, Samuel Z. Stone Professor of Latin American Economics and the director of the CEQ Institute at Tulane University
- Nancy MacLean, historian, William H. Chafe Professor of History and Public Policy at Duke University
- Nicole Maestas, economist, professor of Health Care Policy at Harvard Medical School, Research Associate of the National Bureau of Economic Research
- Neale Mahoney, economist, professor of Economics at Stanford University, George P. Shultz Fellow at the Stanford Institute for Economic Policy Research
- Daniel R. Mandell, historian, professor at Truman State University
- Michael E. Mann, climatologist and geophysicist, director of the Center for Science, Sustainability, & the Media at the University of Pennsylvania
- Stephen Marks, economist, professor of economics at Pomona College
- Megan Marshall, historian, assistant professor in writing, Literature & Publishing at Emerson College
- John F. Marszalek, historian, executive director emeritus of the Ulysses S. Grant Association
- Alex Marzano-Lesnevich, writer, assistant professor and Rogers Communications Chair in Creative Non-Fiction at the University of British Columbia
- Eric Maskin, economist and mathematician, Adams University Professor and professor of Economics and Mathematics at Harvard University, recipient of the Nobel Memorial Prize in Economic Sciences in 2007
- John C. Mather, astrophysicist and cosmologist, professor of physics at the University of Maryland College of Computer, Mathematical, and Natural Sciences, recipient of the Nobel Prize in Physics in 2006
- John Matteson, professor of English and legal writing at John Jay College of Criminal Justice
- Joseph A. McCartin, historian, professor of history at Georgetown University, executive director of the Kalmanovitz Initiative for Labor and the Working Poor
- Sara McDougall, historian, professor of history at the John Jay College of Criminal Justice, professor at the CUNY Graduate Center for the fields of Biography and Memoir, French, History, and Medieval Studies
- Robert S. McElvaine, historian, Elizabeth Chisholm Professor of Arts and Letters and Chair of the Department of History at Millsaps College
- Daniel McFadden, econometrician, Presidential Professor of Health Economics at the University of Southern California, professor of the Graduate School at University of California, Berkeley, recipient of the Nobel Memorial Prize in Economic Sciences in 2000
- Jon Meacham, writer and historian, Carolyn T. and Robert M. Rogers Endowed Chair in American Presidency at Vanderbilt University
- Craig Mello, biologist, professor of molecular medicine at the University of Massachusetts Medical School, recipient of the Nobel Prize in Physiology or Medicine in 2006
- Robert C. Merton, economist, Distinguished Professor of Finance at the MIT Sloan School of Management, recipient of the Nobel Memorial Prize in Economic Sciences in 1997
- Gilbert E. Metcalf, economist, professor of Citizenship and Public Service, emeritus at Tufts University, visiting professor at the MIT Sloan School of Management
- Joanne Meyerowitz, historian, Arthur Unobskey Professor of History at Yale University
- Tiya Miles, historian, Michael Garvey Professor of History at Harvard University, Radcliffe Alumnae Professor at the Radcliffe Institute for Advanced Study
- Adrian Miller, culinary historian
- Donald L. Miller, biographer and historian, John Henry MacCracken Professor of History emeritus at Lafayette College
- David Mindich, historian, chair of the journalism department at Temple University
- Lawrence Mishel, economist, distinguished professor and former president of the Economic Policy Institute
- William E. Moerner, physical chemist and chemical physicist, professor at Stanford University, recipient of the Nobel Prize in Chemistry in 2014
- Jennifer L. Morgan, historian, professor in the Department of Social and Cultural Analysis at New York University
- Mary Morris, writer, writing faculty professor at Sarah Lawrence College
- Khalil Gibran Muhammad, historian, Ford Foundation Professor of History, Race, and Public Policy at Harvard Kennedy School and the Radcliffe Institute
- Melissa Murray, academic and legal scholar, co-host of Strict Scrutiny
- David N. Myers, historian, professor of history and Sady and Ludwig Kahn Chair in Jewish History at the University of California, Los Angeles
- Roger Myerson, economist, David L. Pearson Distinguished Service Professor of Global Conflict Studies at The Pearson Institute for the Study and Resolution of Global Conflicts in the Harris School of Public Policy, the Griffin Department of Economics, and the College of the University of Chicago, recipient of the Nobel Memorial Prize in Economic Sciences in 2007
- David Nasaw, biographer and historian, Arthur M. Schlesinger Jr. Professor of History at the CUNY Graduate Center
- Julie A. Nelson, feminist economist, emeritus professor of economics at the University of Massachusetts Boston
- Roger Noll, economist, emeritus professor of economics at Stanford University, fellow and director of the Program in Regulatory Policy at the Stanford Institute for Economic Policy Research
- William Nordhaus, economist, Sterling Professor of Economics at Yale University, recipient of the Nobel Memorial Prize in Economic Sciences in 2018
- James Oakes, historian, Distinguished Professor of History and Graduate School Humanities Professor at the CUNY Graduate Center
- Jean O'Brien, historian in northeastern Woodlands American Indian history, McKnight Distinguished University Professor at the University of Minnesota
- Caitlin O'Connell-Rodwell, conservation biologist, instructor at Harvard Medical School
- John O'Keefe, American-British neuroscientist and psychologist, professor at the Sainsbury Wellcome Centre for Neural Circuits and Behaviour and the Research Department of Cell and Developmental Biology at the University College London, recipient of the Nobel Prize in Physiology or Medicine in 2014
- Martha Olney, economist, teaching professor of economics at the University of California, Berkeley
- Catherine Opie, photographer, professor of photography at the University of California, Los Angeles
- Patricia O'Toole, historian, Society of American Historians fellow
- Spencer Overton, lawyer, election law scholar, tenured law professor at George Washington University Law School
- Nell Irvin Painter, historian, president of the Organization of American Historians
- Costas Panagopoulos, political scientist, professor of political science at Northeastern University
- Richard Parker, economist, lecturer in public policy and senior fellow at the Joan Shorenstein Center on the Press, Politics and Public Policy at Harvard University's Kennedy School of Government
- Susan Wendy Parker, economist, professor and associate director of the Maryland Population Research Center at the University of Maryland School of Public Policy
- Ardem Patapoutian, Lebanese-American molecular biologist and neuroscientist, neuroscience professor and Howard Hughes Medical Institute investigator at Scripps Research, recipient of the Nobel Prize in Physiology or Medicine in 2021
- Jim Peebles, Canadian-American astrophysicist, astronomer, and theoretical cosmologist, former Albert Einstein Professor in Science emeritus at Princeton University, recipient of the Nobel Prize in Physics in 2019
- Edmund Phelps, economist, McVickar Professor Emeritus of Political Economy at Columbia University, recipient of the Nobel Memorial Prize in Economic Sciences in 2006
- Robert Pindyck, economist, professor of Economics and Finance at Sloan School of Management
- John J. Pitney, political scientist, Roy P. Crocker Professor of Politics at Claremont McKenna College (Republican)
- Hugh David Politzer, theoretical physicist, Richard Chace Tolman Professor of Theoretical Physics at the California Institute of Technology, recipient of the Nobel Prize in Physics in 2004
- Michael Pollan, Knight Professor of Science and Environmental Journalism and the director of the Knight Program in Science and Environmental Journalism at the UC Berkeley Graduate School of Journalism
- Robert Pollin, economist, professor at the University of Massachusetts Amherst, founding co-director of the Political Economy Research Institute
- Kenneth Pomeranz, historian, professor of History at the University of Chicago
- Claire Potter, historian, professor of history at The New School
- Jon Powers, energy security expert
- Soong-Chan Rah, professor of Evangelism at Fuller Theological Seminary
- Rita F. Redberg, cardiologist, professor of clinical medicine at the University of California, San Francisco
- Ian Reifowitz, historian, SUNY Distinguished Professor of Historical Studies at Empire State University
- Susan Mokotoff Reverby, historian, professor at Wellesley College
- Charles M. Rice, virologist, professor of virology at the Rockefeller University, recipient of the Nobel Prize in Physiology or Medicine in 2020
- Heather Cox Richardson, historian
- Richard J. Roberts, British biochemist and molecular biologist, faculty at New England Biolabs, recipient of the Nobel Prize in Physiology or Medicine in 1993
- Dani Rodrik, Turkish economist, Ford Foundation Professor of International Political Economy at the Harvard Kennedy School
- Paul Romer, economist, University Professor in Economics at Boston College, former chief economist of the World Bank, recipient of the Nobel Memorial Prize in Economic Sciences in 2018
- Michael Rosbash, geneticist and chronobiologist, director of the Brandeis National Center for Behavioral Genomics at Brandeis University, recipient of the Nobel Prize in Physiology or Medicine in 2017
- Caitlin Rosenthal, historian, associate professor at the University of California, Berkeley
- Alvin E. Roth, economist, Craig and Susan McCaw professor of economics at Stanford University, Gund professor of economics and business administration emeritus at Harvard University, recipient of the Nobel Memorial Prize in Economic Sciences in 2012
- Michael S. Roth, President of Wesleyan University
- Christopher Ruhm, economist, professor of public policy and economics at the University of Virginia
- Gary Ruvkun, molecular biologists, professor of genetics at Harvard Medical School, recipient of the Nobel Prize in Physiology or Medicine in 2024
- Emmanuel Saez, economist, professor of economics at the University of California, Berkeley
- Scott Sagan, Caroline S.G. Munro Professor of Political Science at Stanford University, co-director of Stanford's Center for International Security and Cooperation
- Steven C. Salop, economist, professor of economics and law at the Georgetown University Law Center
- Martha A. Sandweiss, historian, professor of history at Princeton University
- Dana Sawyer, professor emeritus of religious studies and world religions at the Maine College of Art & Design
- Randy Schekman, cell biologist, professor at the University of California, Berkeley, recipient of the Nobel Prize in Physiology or Medicine in 2013
- Stephen Schlesinger, historian, fellow at The Century Foundation
- Ellen Schrecker, historian, professor emerita of American history at Yeshiva University
- Richard R. Schrock, chemist, Distinguished Professor and George K. Helmkamp Founder's Chair of Chemistry at the University of California, Riverside, recipient of the Nobel Prize in Chemistry in 2005
- Stephanie Seguino, feminist professor of economics at the University of Vermont
- Gregg L. Semenza, pediatrician, professor of Genetic Medicine at the Johns Hopkins School of Medicine, director of the vascular program at the Institute for Cell Engineering, recipient of the Nobel Prize in Physiology or Medicine in 2019
- Willi Semmler, economist, professor at The New School
- Peter M. Shane, legal scholar, Jacob E. Davis and Jacob E. Davis II Chair in Law at the Moritz College of Law at The Ohio State University
- James J. Sheehan, historian of modern Germany, Dickason Professor in the Humanities and Professor of History at Stanford University
- Hersh Shefrin, professor of Behavioral Finance at the Santa Clara University
- Robert J. Shiller, economist, Sterling Professor of Economics at Yale University and is a fellow at the Yale School of Management's International Center for Finance, recipient of the Nobel Memorial Prize in Economic Sciences in 2013
- Hampton Sides, historian, member of the Society of American Historians
- Mona L. Siegel, historian, professor at California State University, Sacramento
- Nate Silver, statistician, founder of FiveThirtyEight
- Damon Silvers, former policy director of the AFL-CIO
- Ganesh Sitaraman, legal scholar, professor of law at Vanderbilt University
- Mark Skidmore, economist, professor of Economics and Agricultural, Food, and Resource Economics at Michigan State University
- Kathryn Kish Sklar, historian, Distinguished Professor Emerita at the State University of New York at Binghamton
- Richard Slotkin, cultural critic and historian, Olin Professor of English and American Studies Emeritus at Wesleyan University
- William Smaldone, historian, E. J. Whipple Professor of European history at Willamette University
- Hamilton O. Smith, microbiologist and biochemist, faculty at the J. Craig Venter Institute, director of the Synthetic Genomics, recipient of the Nobel Prize in Physiology or Medicine in 1978
- Helmut Walser Smith, historian, Martha Rivers Ingram chair and Professor of History at Vanderbilt University
- Noah Smith, economist, blogger and journalist
- Ilya Somin, legal scholar, professor at George Mason University, B. Kenneth Simon Chair in Constitutional Studies at the Cato Institute
- David Sorkin, Jewish historian, Lucy G. Moses professor of Jewish history at Yale University
- Fatima Cody Stanford, obesity medicine physician, internist, and pediatrician, associate professor of medicine and pediatrics at Harvard Medical School
- Amy Dru Stanley, historian of American history, women's history, and emancipation, associate professor in history at the University of Chicago
- John Stauffer, professor of English, American Studies, and African American Studies at Harvard University
- Sandra Steingraber, biologist, co-founder of Concerned Health Professionals of New York
- Fraser Stoddart, British-American chemist, Chair Professor in Chemistry at the University of Hong Kong, Board of Trustees Professor of Chemistry and head of the Stoddart Mechanostereochemistry Group in the Department of Chemistry at Northwestern University, recipient of the Nobel Prize in Chemistry in 2016
- Leah Stokes, associate professor of Environmental Politics at the University of California, Santa Barbara
- Margaret Strobel, professor emerita of Gender and Women's Studies at the University of Illinois Chicago
- Myra Strober, professor of education emerita at Stanford Graduate School of Business
- Jeremi Suri, historian, Mack Brown Distinguished Chair for Leadership in Global Affairs at the University of Texas at Austin
- Craig L. Symonds, historian, professor emeritus in the Department of History at the U. S. Naval Academy
- Sarah Sze, professor of visual arts at Columbia University
- Jack W. Szostak, Canadian American biologist, University Professor at the University of Chicago, Alexander Rich Distinguished Investigator at Massachusetts General Hospital, recipient of the Nobel Prize in Physiology or Medicine in 2009
- Sam Tanenhaus, historian, professor at University of St. Michael's College
- Deborah Tannen, writer, professor of linguistics at Georgetown University
- Jennifer Taub, law professor, commentator, and author
- Joseph Hooton Taylor Jr., astrophysicist, former James S. McDonnell Distinguished University Professor in Physics and dean of faculty at Princeton University, recipient of the Nobel Prize in Physics in 1993
- Linda Tesar, professor of economics and director of graduate studies at the University of Michigan College of Literature, Science, and the Arts of the University of Michigan
- Richard Thaler, economist, Charles R. Walgreen Distinguished Service Professor of Behavioral Science and Economics at the University of Chicago Booth School of Business, recipient of the Nobel Memorial Prize in Economic Sciences in 2017
- Ebony Elizabeth Thomas, writer, associate professor in Educational Studies at the University of Michigan School of Education
- Kip Thorne, theoretical physicist, former Richard P. Feynman Professor of Theoretical Physics at the California Institute of Technology, recipient of the Nobel Prize in Physics in 2017
- Nancy Tomes, historian, Distinguished Professor at Stony Brook University
- Jean Trounstine, professor emerita of humanities at Middlesex Community College
- Daniel C. Tsui, physicist, professor of Electrical Engineering, emeritus, at Princeton University, recipient of the Nobel Prize in Physics in 1998
- Jeffrey K. Tulis, political scientist, Professor of Government at the University of Texas at Austin
- Stephen J. Turnovsky, New Zealand economist, Ford and Louisa Van Voorhis Professor of Political Economy at the University of Washington
- Elizabeth Varon, historian, Langbourne M. Williams Professor of American History at the University of Virginia
- Abraham Verghese, physician, Linda R. Meier and Joan F. Lane Provostial Professor of Medicine, Vice Chair for the Theory & Practice of Medicine, and Internal Medicine Clerkship Director at Stanford University Medical School
- Alessandra Voena, Italian development and labor economist, professor of Economics at Stanford University
- Penny Von Eschen, historian, professor of History and William R. Kenan Jr. Professor of American Studies at the University of Virginia
- Jerald Walker, writer, professor of creative writing and African American literature at Emerson College
- Daniel Walkowitz, historian, professor in the Department of History and the Department of Social and Cultural Analysis at New York University
- Carl E. Walsh, economist, former Distinguished Professor of Economics at the University of California, Santa Cruz
- Denise Walsh, political scientist, professor of political science and women, gender and sexuality at the University of Virginia
- Stephen Walt, political scientist, Robert and Renee Belfer Professor of international relations at the Harvard Kennedy School
- Jane Ward, professor and chair of Feminist Studies at the University of California, Santa Barbara
- Susan Ware, historian, specialist on 20th-century women's political and cultural history, and the history of popular feminism
- Rainer Weiss, German-American physicist, professor of physics emeritus at the Massachusetts Institute of Technology, adjunct faculty at Louisiana State University, recipient of the Nobel Prize in Physics in 2017
- Drew Weissman, physician and immunologist, Roberts Family Professor in Vaccine Research, director of the Penn Institute for RNA Innovation, and professor of medicine at the Perelman School of Medicine at the University of Pennsylvania, recipient of the Nobel Prize in Physiology or Medicine in 2023
- Laura Wexler, feminist theorist, professor of American Studies, professor of Women's, Gender, and Sexuality Studies, and co-chair of the Women's Faculty Forum at Yale University
- Glen Weyl, economist at Microsoft Research
- Warren Whatley, economist, emeritus professor of economics at the University of Michigan
- Ronald C. White, historian, senior fellow at the Trinity Forum
- M. Stanley Whittingham, British-American chemist, professor of chemistry and director of the Institute for Materials Research and the Materials Science and Engineering program at Binghamton University, recipient of the Nobel Prize in Chemistry in 2019
- Carl Wieman, physicist, A. D. White Professor at Large at Cornell University, professor of Physics and professor in the Stanford Graduate School of Education, DRC Professor in the Stanford University School of Engineering, recipient of the Nobel Prize in Physics in 2001
- Eric F. Wieschaus, evolutionary developmental biologist, Squibb Professor in Molecular Biology at Princeton University, recipient of the Nobel Prize in Physiology or Medicine in 1995
- Torsten Wiesel, Swedish neurophysiologist, co-director of the Shelby White and Leon Levy Center for Mind, Brain and Behavior and former president of Rockefeller University, recipient of the Nobel Prize in Physiology or Medicine in 1981
- Frank Wilczek, theoretical physicist and mathematician, Herman Feshbach Professor of Physics at the Massachusetts Institute of Technology, recipient of the Nobel Prize in Physics in 2004
- Sean Wilentz, historian, George Henry Davis 1886 Professor of American History at Princeton University
- Robert Woodrow Wilson, astronomer, discovered cosmic microwave background radiation, recipient of the Nobel Prize in Physics in 1978
- Barbara Winslow, historian, associate professor in the School of Education at Brooklyn College
- Barbara Wolfe, economist, professor of economics, Population Health Sciences, and Public Affairs at the University of Wisconsin–Madison
- Justin Wolfers, economist and public policy scholar, professor of economics and public policy at the Gerald R. Ford School of Public Policy
- Catherine Wolfram, microeconomist, professor in Energy and professor of Applied Economics at the MIT Sloan School of Management
- Gavin Wright, economic historian, professor of American Economic History at Stanford University
- Gary Yohe, professor of Economics and Environmental Studies at Wesleyan University
- Rosemarie Zagarri, historian, professor of history at George Mason University
- David Zilberman, agricultural economist, professor and Robinson Chair in the Department of Agricultural and Resource Economics at the University of California, Berkeley
- Andrew Zimbalist, economist, professor of economics at Smith College
- Gabriel Zucman, French economist, associate professor of public policy and economics at the Goldman School of Public Policy, director of the EU Tax Observatory

== Labor leaders ==
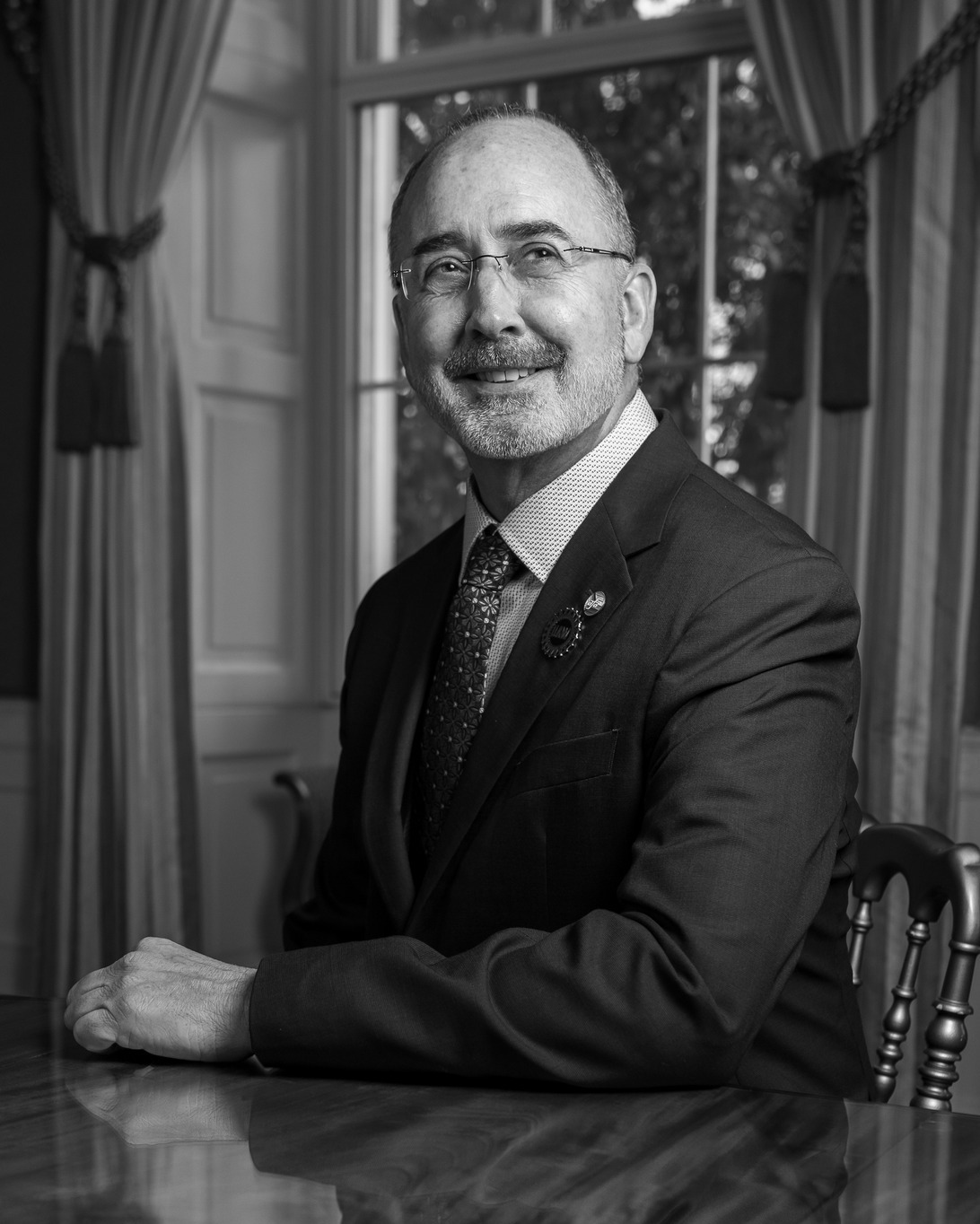
Shawn Fain

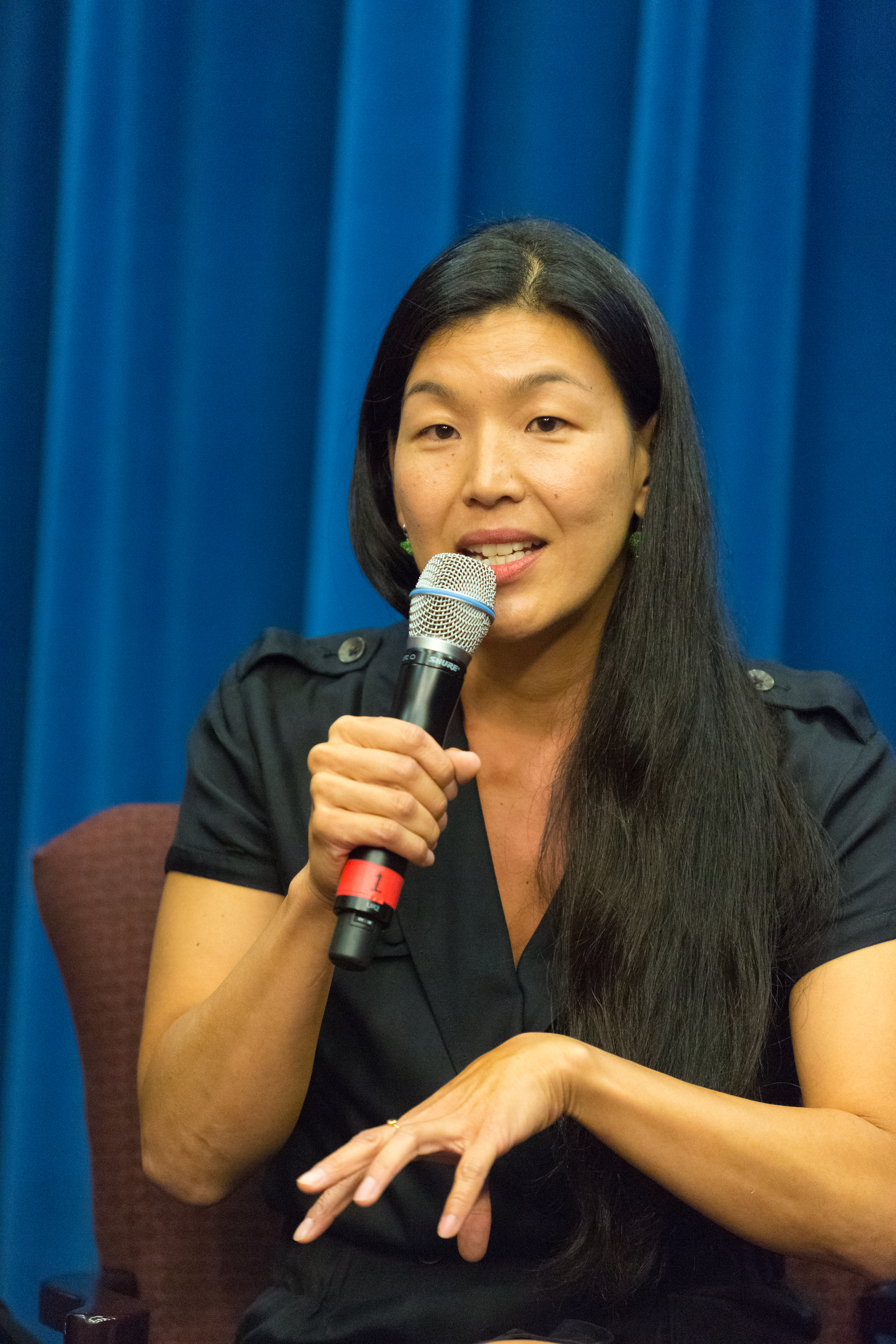
Ai-jen Poo

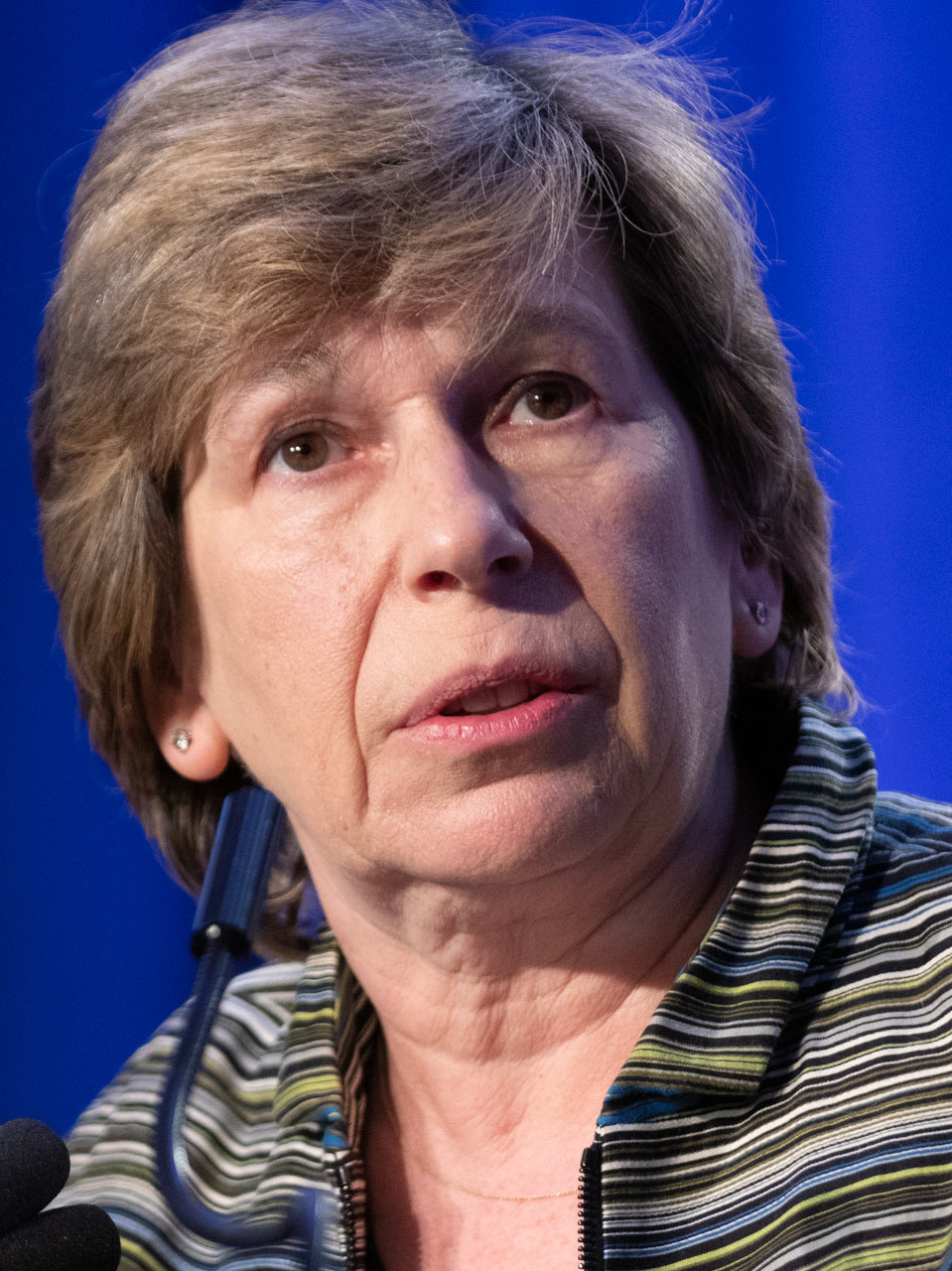
Randi Weingarten

- Stuart Appelbaum, president of the Retail, Wholesale and Department Store Union
- Brent Booker, labor union leader and president of the Laborers' International Union of North America
- Clayola Brown, labor unionist, civil rights activist, and president of the A. Philip Randolph Institute
- Bonnie Castillo, executive director of the National Nurses United
- Kenneth W. Cooper, president of the International Brotherhood of Electrical Workers
- Claude Cummings Jr., president of the Communications Workers of America
- Shawn Fain, president of the United Auto Workers
- Stacy Davis Gates, president of the Chicago Teachers Union
- James P. Hoffa, former general president of the International Brotherhood of Teamsters (1998–2022)
- Dolores Huerta, labor leader, civil rights activist, co-founder of United Farm Workers
- Everett Kelley, president of the American Federation of Government Employees
- Sean McGarvey, president of the North America's Building Trades Unions
- Sara Nelson, president of the Association of Flight Attendants
- John Palmer, vice president at large of the International Brotherhood of Teamsters
- Marc Perrone, president of the United Food and Commercial Workers
- Ai-jen Poo, president of the National Domestic Workers Alliance
- Becky Pringle, president of the National Education Association
- Fred Redmond, president of the Trade Union Confederation of the Americas and secretary-treasurer of the AFL-CIO
- Brian Renfroe, president of the National Association of Letter Carriers
- Howard A. Rodman, former president of the Writers Guild of America West
- Teresa Romero, president of the United Farm Workers
- Lee Saunders, president of the American Federation of State, County and Municipal Employees
- Liz Shuler, president of the AFL-CIO (2021–present)
- Lonnie R. Stephenson, former president of the International Brotherhood of Electrical Workers
- Meredith Stiehm, president of the Writers Guild of America West
- Randi Weingarten, president of the American Federation of Teachers

== Lawyers ==
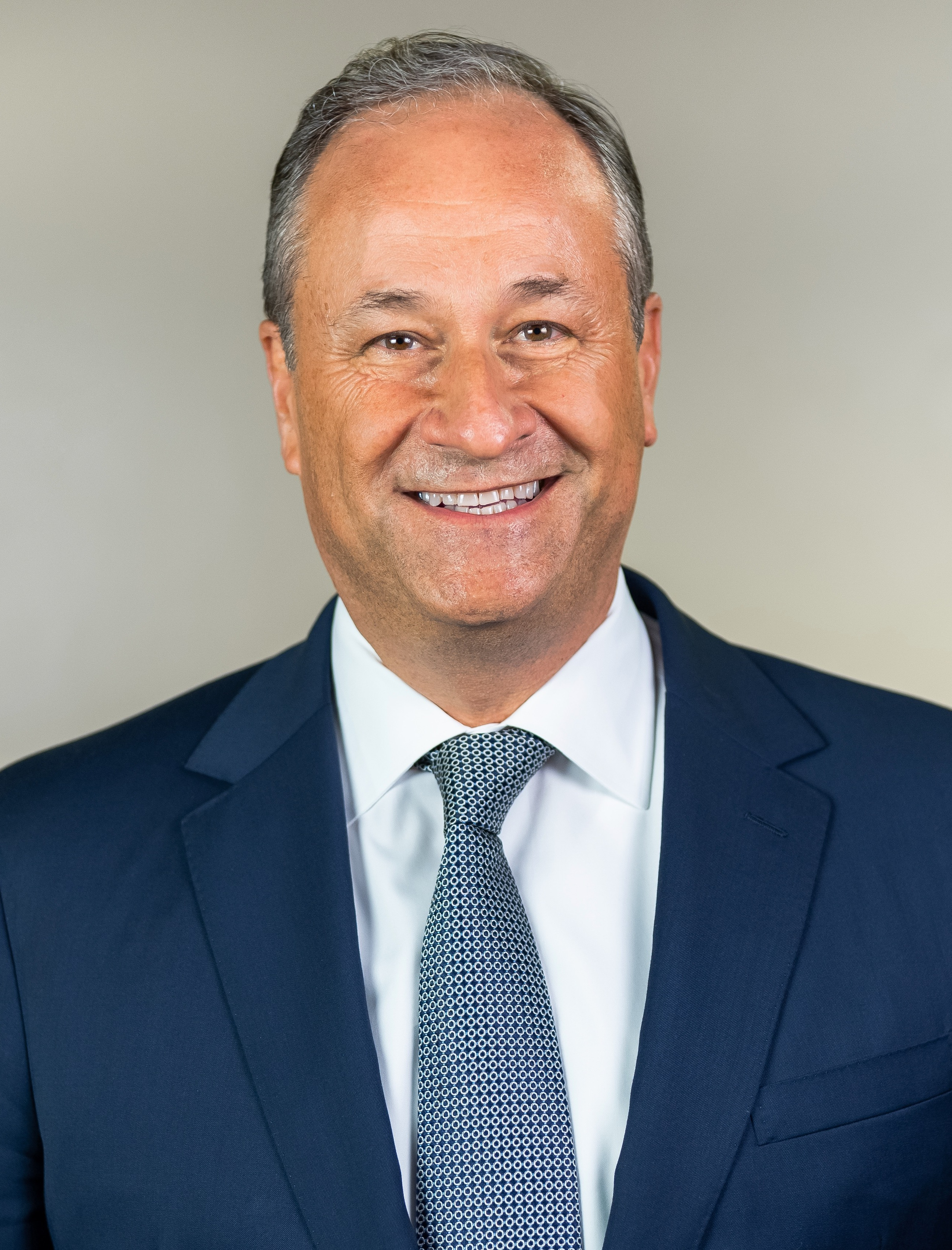
Doug Emhoff

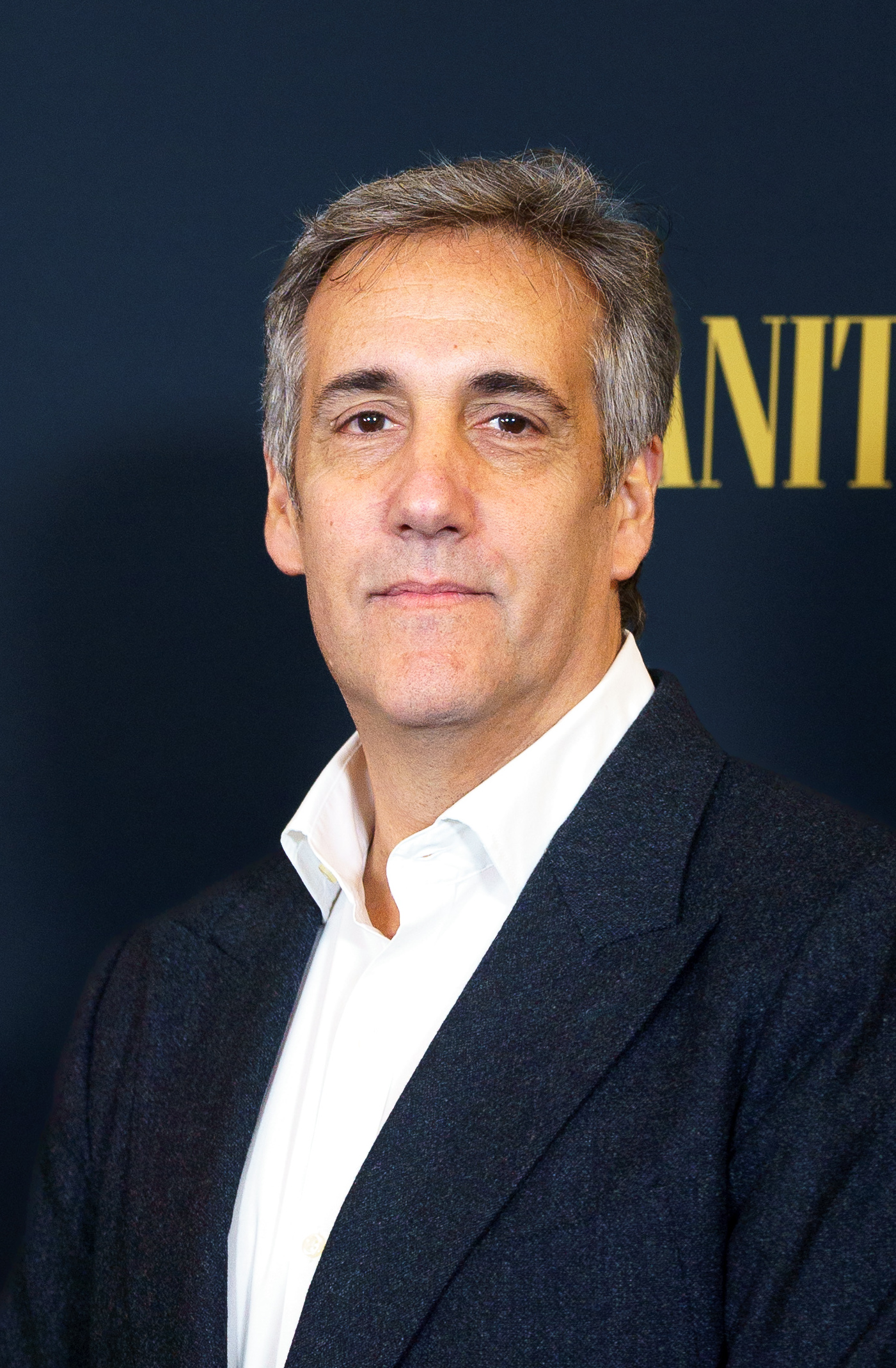
Michael Cohen

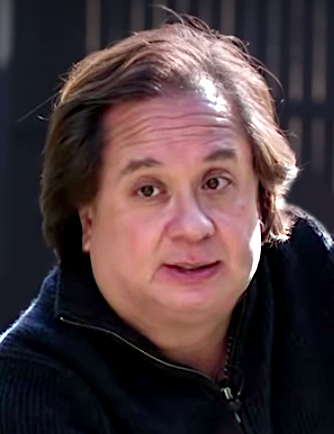
George Conway

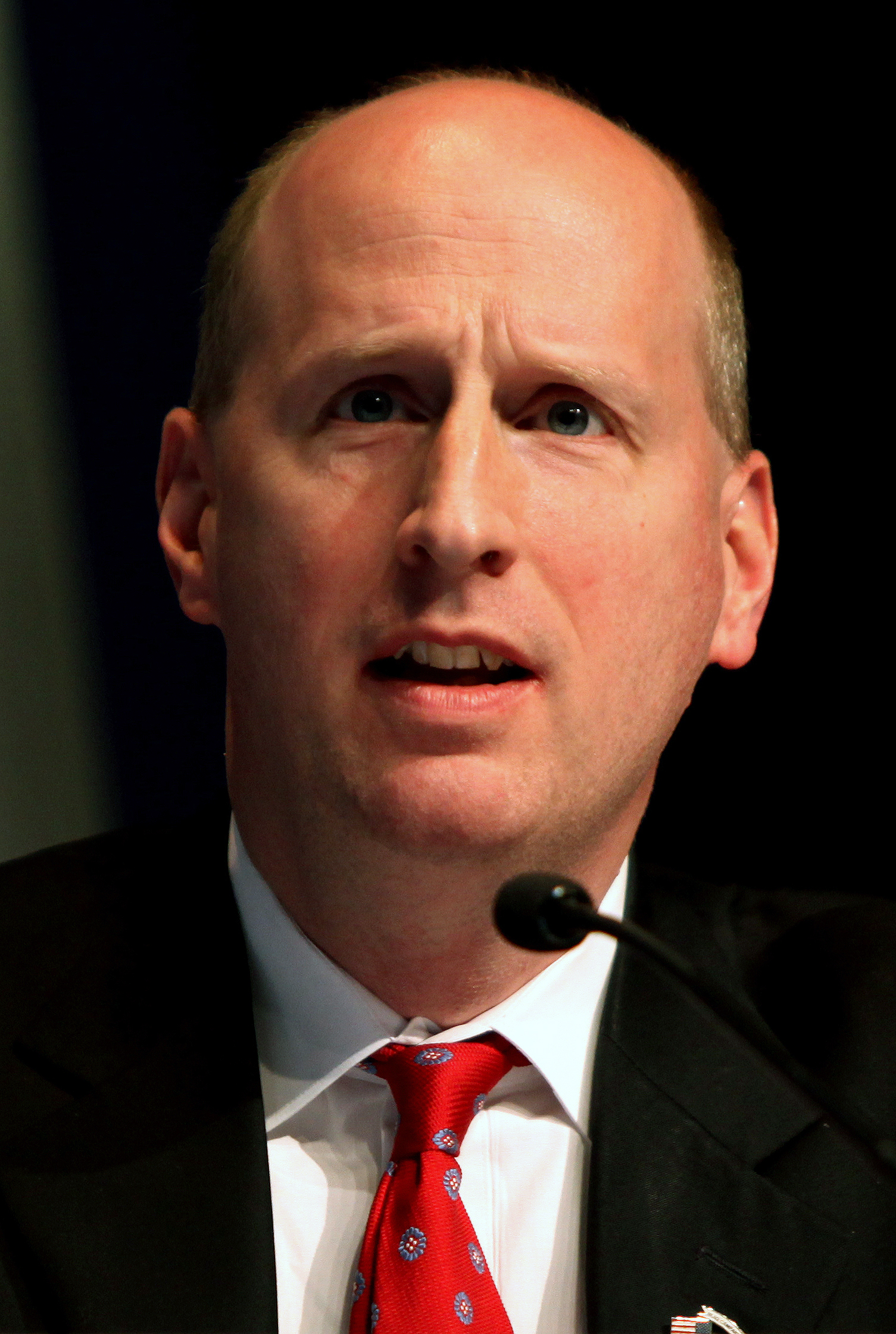
David French

- Gloria Allred, member of Allred, Maroko & Goldberg
- Bradley M. Campbell, president of the Conservation Law Foundation
- Morgan Chu, intellectual property attorney
- H. Rodgin Cohen, senior chairman of Sullivan & Cromwell
- Michael Cohen, lawyer and former attorney of former president and the 2024 Republican presidential nominee Donald Trump
- George Conway, lawyer, activist, and founder of Anti-Psychopath PAC (Independent)
- Benjamin Crump, civil rights attorney
- Alphonso David, lawyer, LGBT civil rights activist, former president of Human Rights Campaign
- Abigail Dillen, environmental lawyer, president of Earthjustice
- Karen Dunn, partner at Paul, Weiss, Rifkind, Wharton & Garrison
- Kimberly Marteau Emerson, attorney, advocate, and member of the US Holocaust Memorial Council
- Doug Emhoff, entertainment lawyer, and Second Gentleman of the United States (2021–2025) (candidate's husband)
- Jill Filipovic, author, attorney
- Charles Foster, immigration attorney
- David French, evangelical political commentator and former attorney, senior editor of The Dispatch, and columnist for The New York Times (Independent, Republican until 2018)
- Tory Gavito, attorney, co-founder and president of Way to Win
- Fatima Goss Graves, lawyer, president and CEO at the National Women's Law Center
- Maya Harris, lawyer, policy adviser, and chair of the 2020 presidential campaign (candidate's sister)
- Brad S. Karp, chair of Paul, Weiss, Rifkind, Wharton & Garrison
- Max Kennedy, lawyer, member of the Kennedy family
- Dale Minami, civil rights and personal injury lawyer
- John Morgan, founder of Morgan & Morgan (Independent)
- Ann O'Leary, partner at Jenner & Block
- Aaron Parnas, Democratic activist, son of Lev Parnas
- Heather Podesta, founder of Heather Podesta + Partners
- Menachem Z. Rosensaft, attorney, founding chairman of the International Network of Children of Jewish Holocaust Survivors
- Faiza Saeed, mergers and acquisitions attorney, presiding partner of Cravath, Swaine & Moore
- James Gustave Speth, environmental lawyer, co-founder of the Natural Resources Defense Council
- Devin Stone, lawyer and YouTuber
- Mini Timmaraju, lawyer, reproductive rights advocate, and president of Reproductive Freedom for All
- Ted Wells, partner at Paul, Weiss, Rifkind, Wharton & Garrison

== Religious figures ==
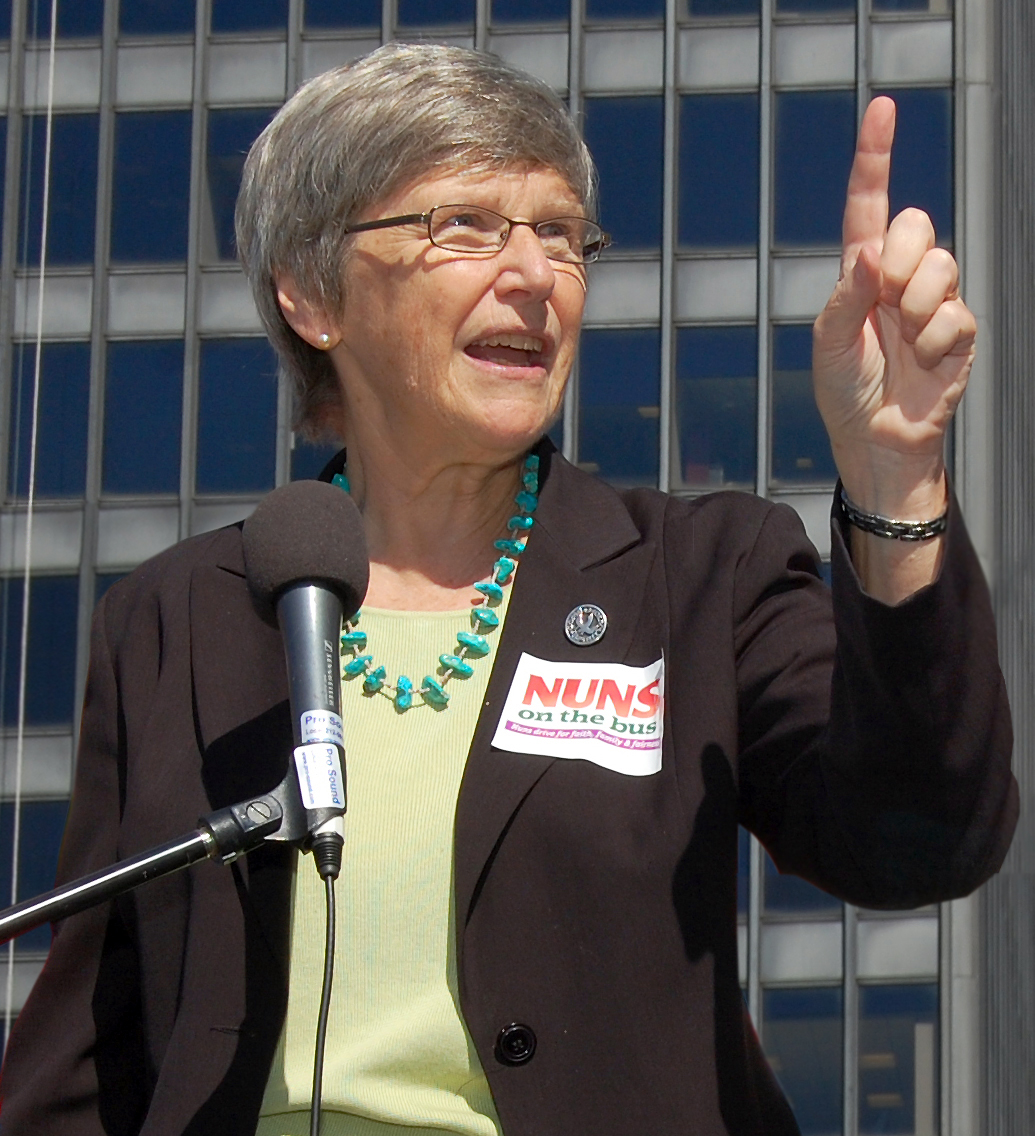
Simone Campbell

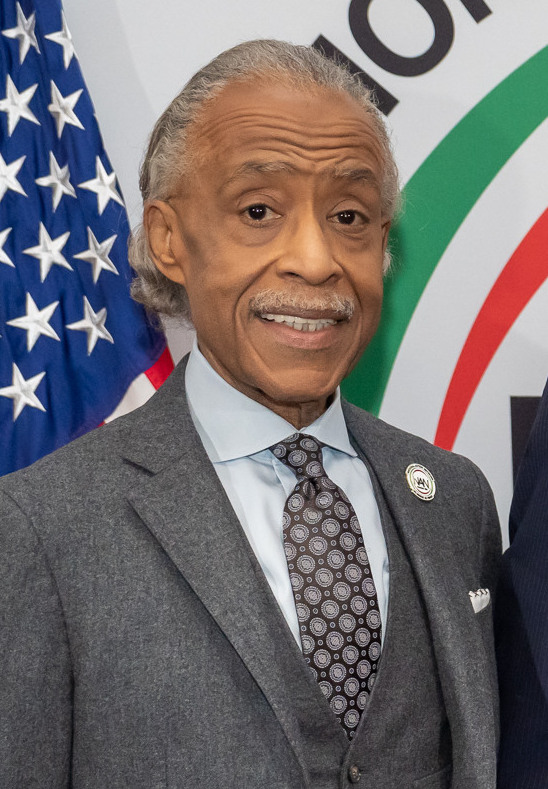
Al Sharpton

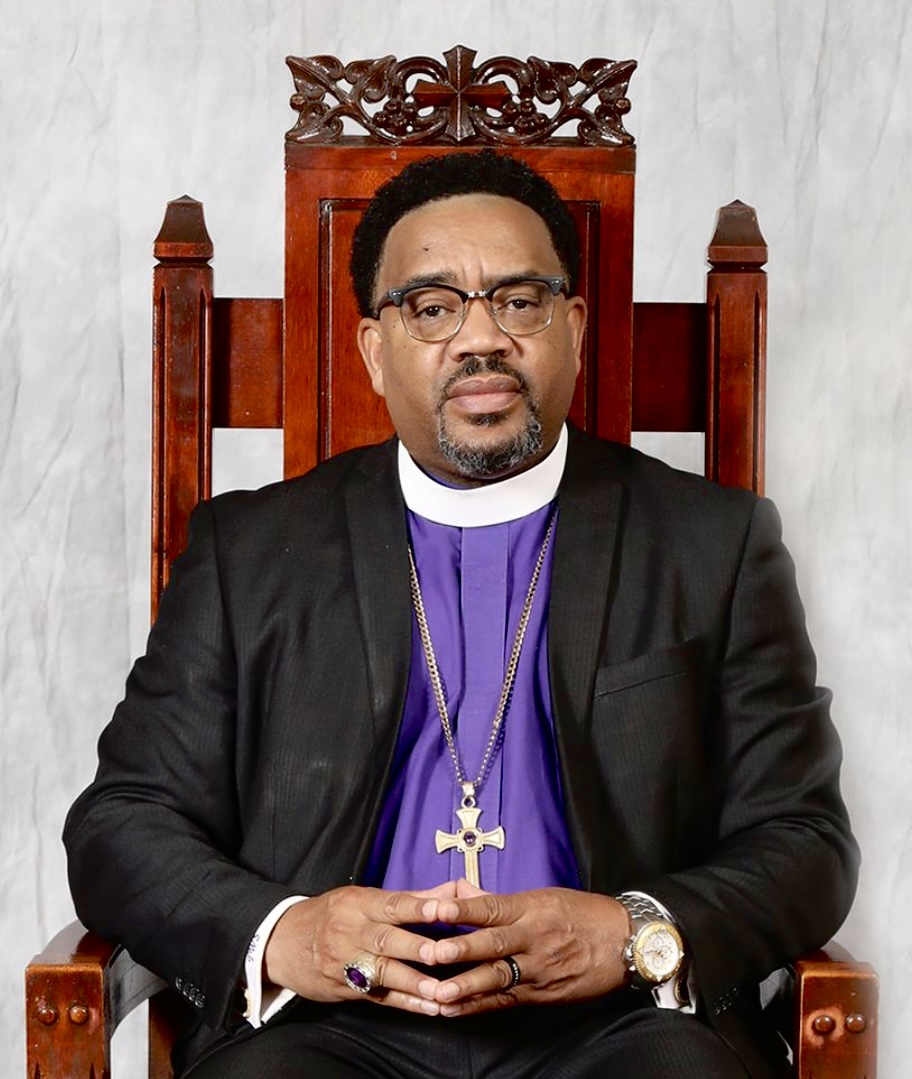
Talbert Swan

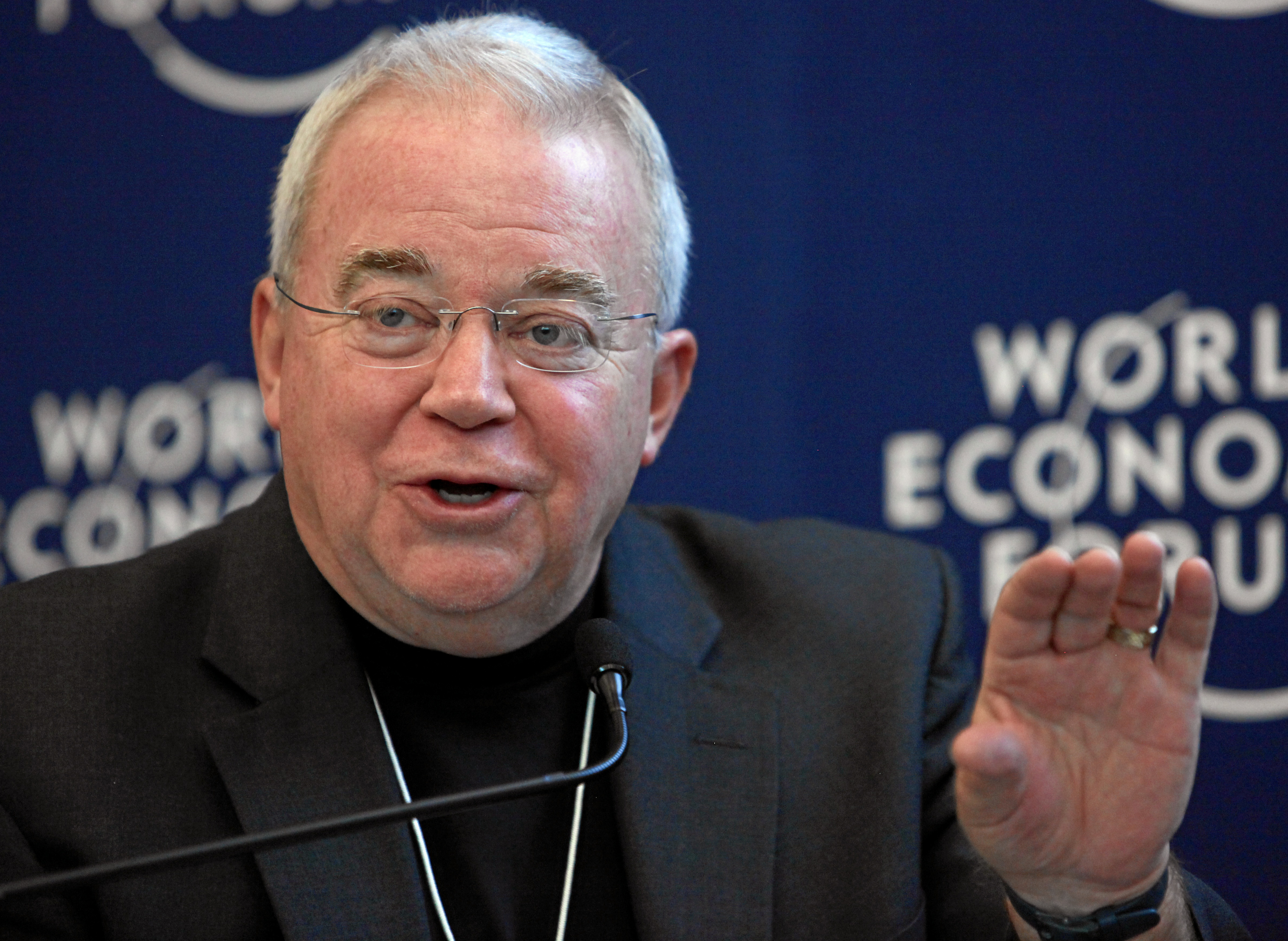
Jim Wallis

- William Barber II, Protestant minister
- Traci D. Blackmon, minister for the United Church of Christ
- Sharon Brous, senior rabbi of IKAR
- Amos Brown, pastor of the Third Baptist Church, civil rights leader
- Jamal Harrison Bryant, senior pastor of New Birth Missionary Baptist Church
- Amy Butler, Christian minister
- Simone Campbell, Catholic religious sister
- Leah D. Daughtry, Christian minister
- Greg Epstein, Humanist chaplain at Harvard University
- Steven Greenberg, Orthodox rabbi
- Steve Gutow, rabbi
- Reginald Jackson, consecrated bishop of the African Methodist Episcopal Church
- David Jaffe, Orthodox rabbi
- Soumaya Khalifa, founder and executive director of the Islamic Speakers Bureau of Atlanta
- Robert W. Lee IV, Protestant minister, descendant of Robert E. Lee
- Vashti Murphy McKenzie, African Methodist Episcopal Church bishop
- Dwight McKissic, Southern Baptist minister
- Brian McLaren, author and Christian theologian
- Otis Moss III, pastor of Chicago's Trinity United Church of Christ
- William Murphy, lead pastor of Dream Center Church of Atlanta
- Yonatan Neril, Orthodox rabbi, environmental advocate
- Kerry Olitzky, rabbi
- Raymond C. Ortlund Jr., priest in the Diocese of the Western Gulf Coast of the Anglican Church in North America
- Doug Pagitt, progressive evangelical pastor
- John Pavlovitz, former youth pastor and author
- Rob Schenck, Evangelical clergyman
- Al Sharpton, civil rights and social justice activist, Baptist minister, radio talk show host, TV personality, founder of the National Action Network
- John Drew Sheard Sr., presiding bishop of the Church of God in Christ
- Talbert W. Swan II, civil rights and social justice activist, Church of God in Christ bishop, radio talk show host, pastor, director of Social Justice for the Church of God in Christ, president of the Greater Springfield, MA NAACP
- Susan Brooks Thistlethwaite, author, former president of the Chicago Theological Seminary
- Jim Wallis, theologian and activist
- Kevin Wildes, priest, president of Loyola University New Orleans (2004–2018)
- Paula Stone Williams, pastor of Envision Community Church
- Shmuly Yanklowitz, Orthodox rabbi
- Lennox Yearwood, minister and community activist, president of the Hip Hop Caucus

== Activists and public figures ==
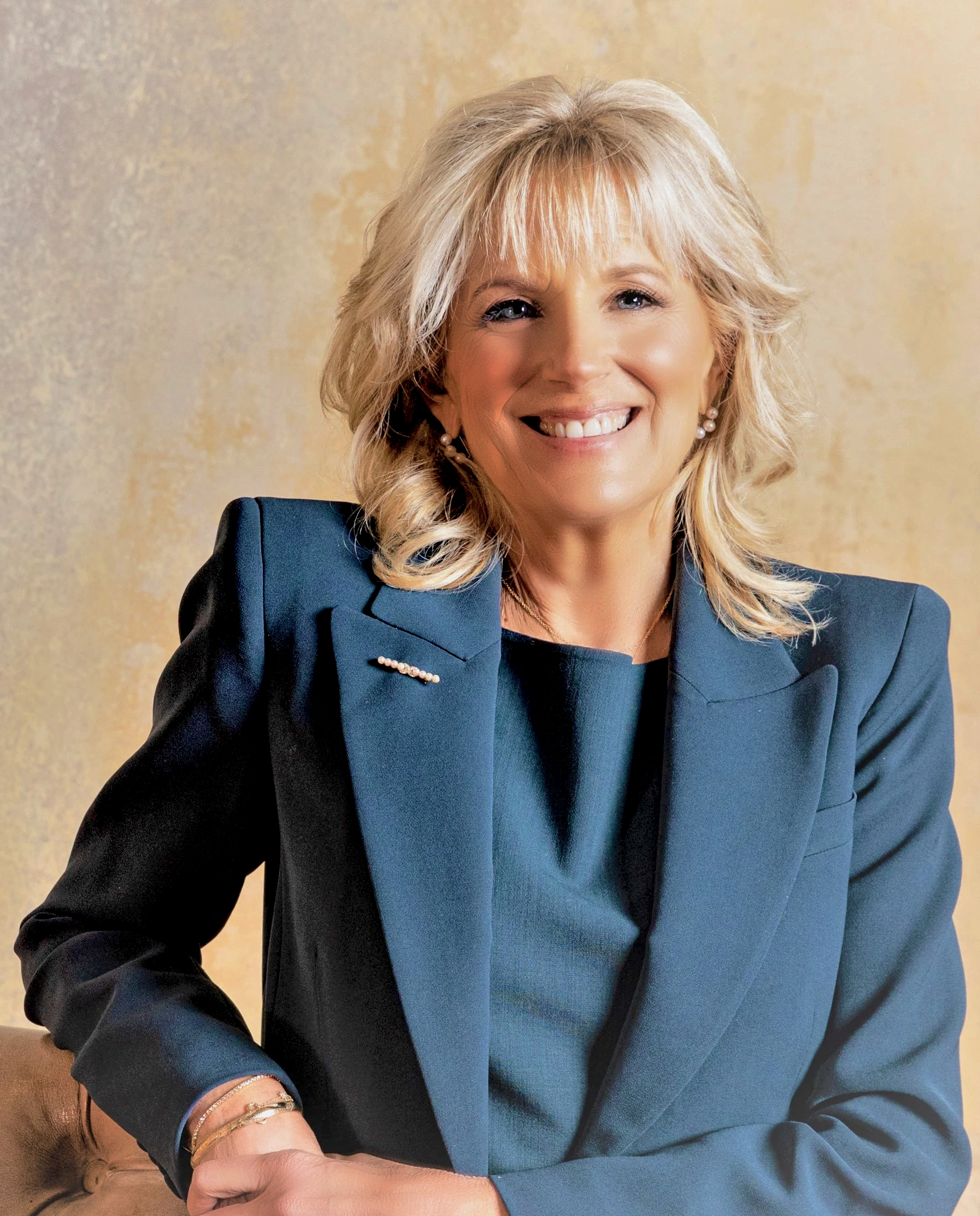
Jill Biden

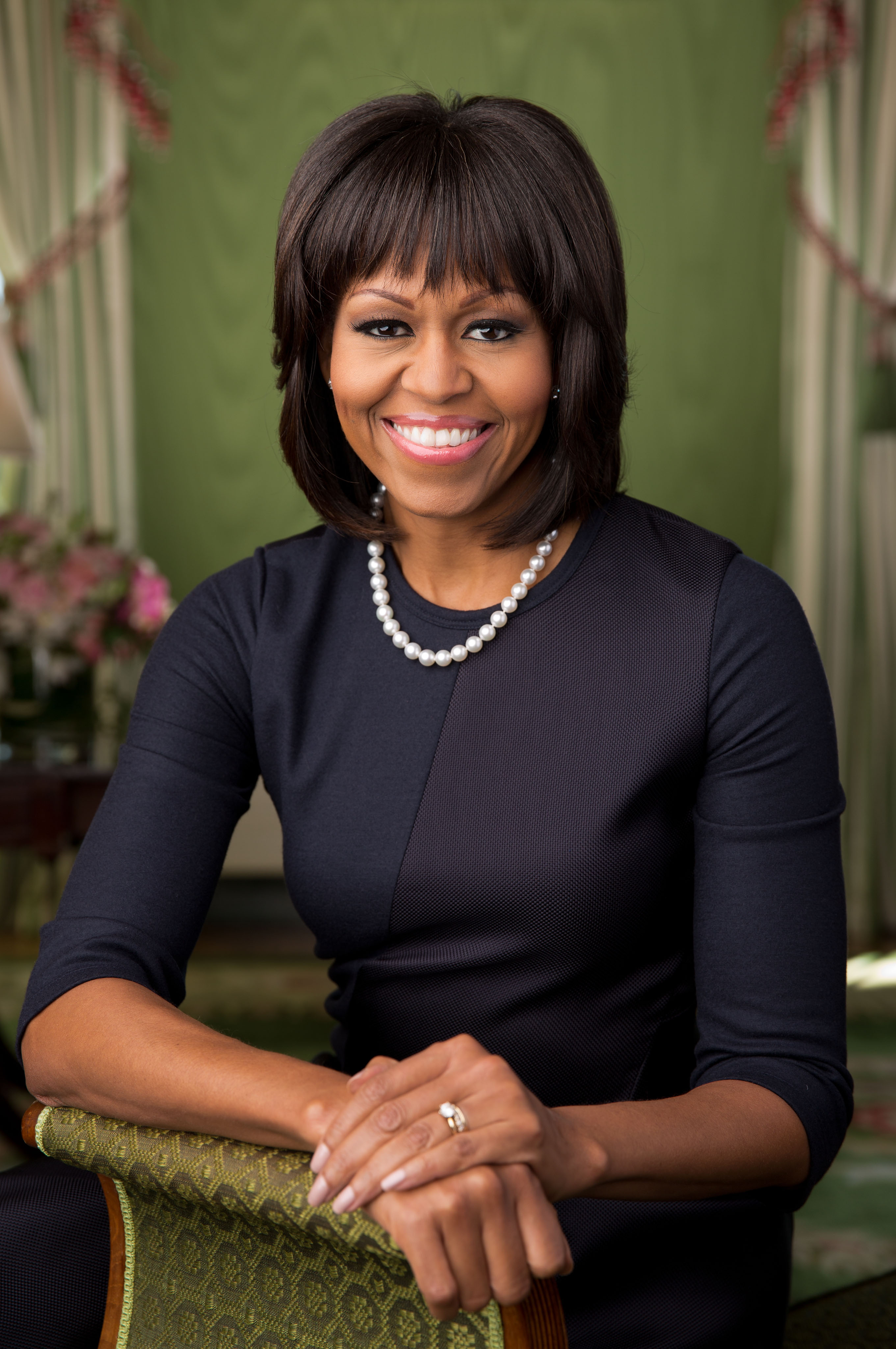
Michelle Obama

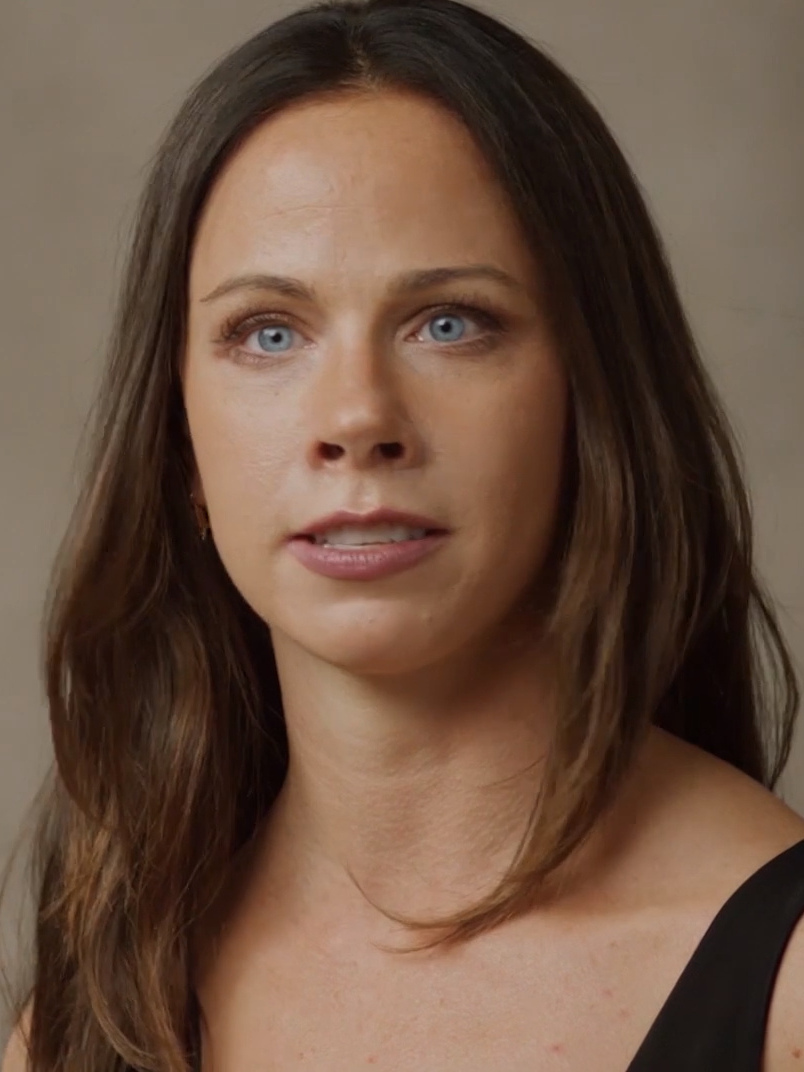
Barbara Pierce Bush

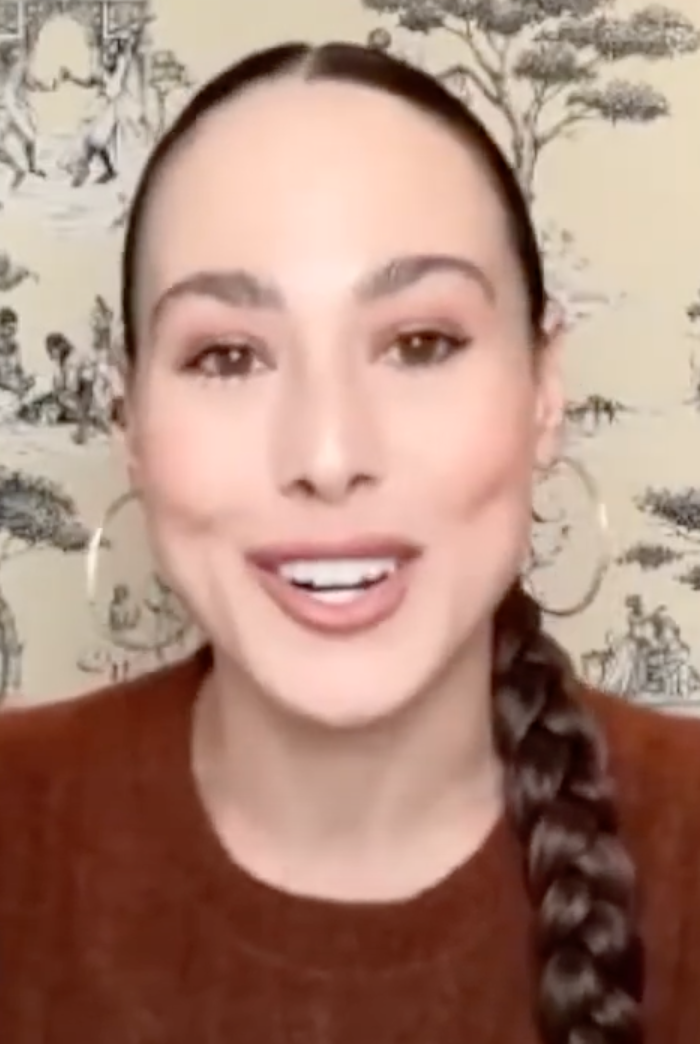
Meena Harris

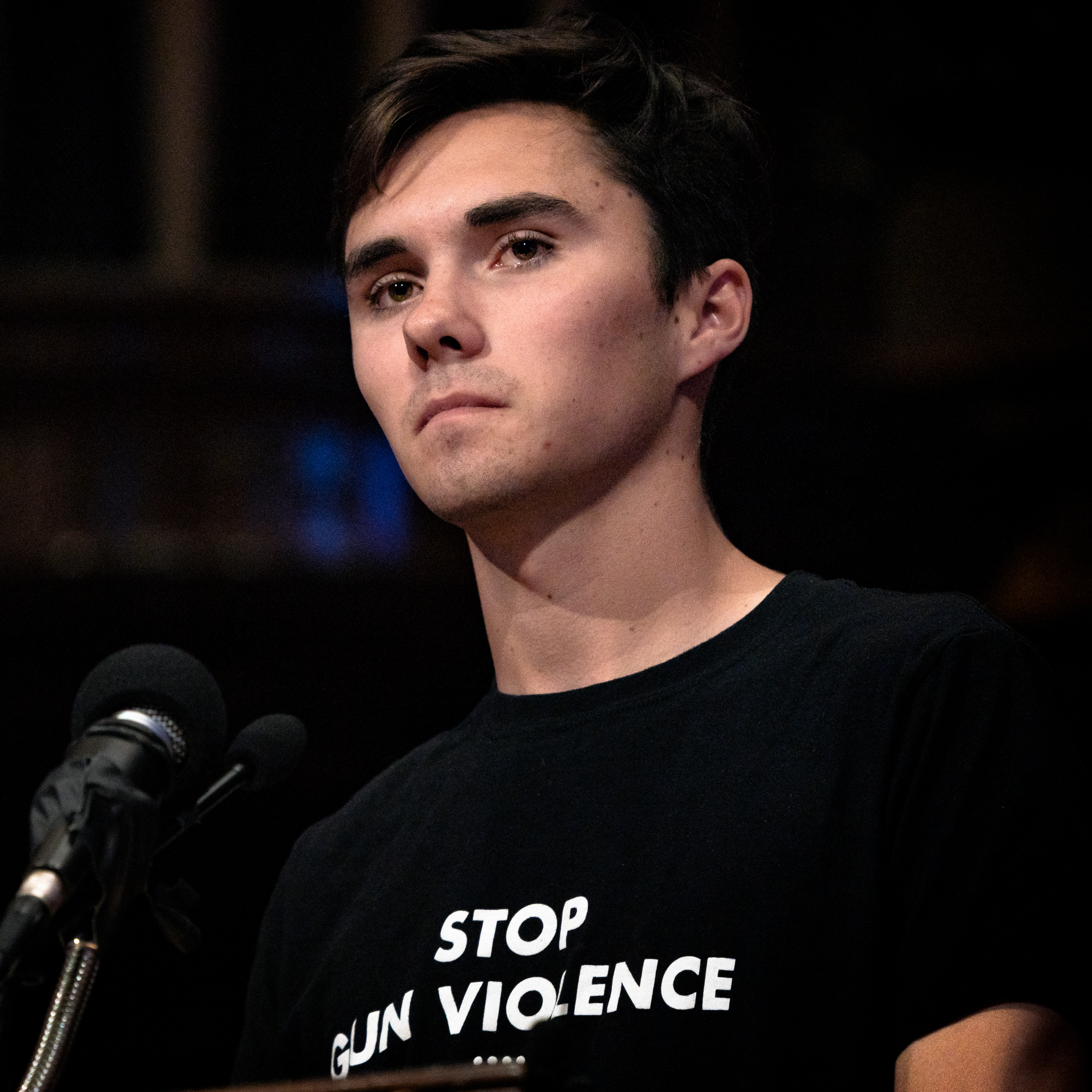
David Hogg

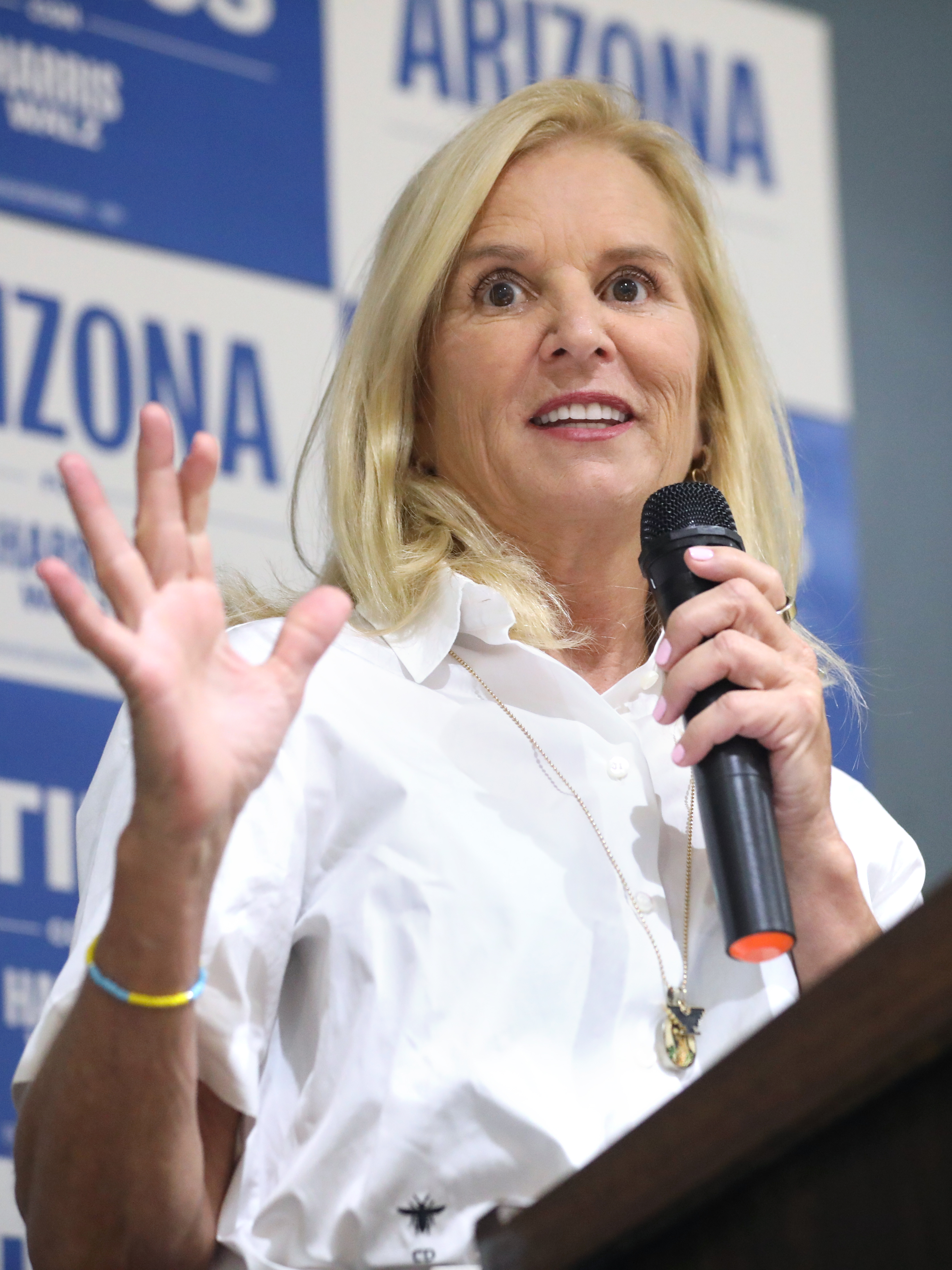
Kerry Kennedy

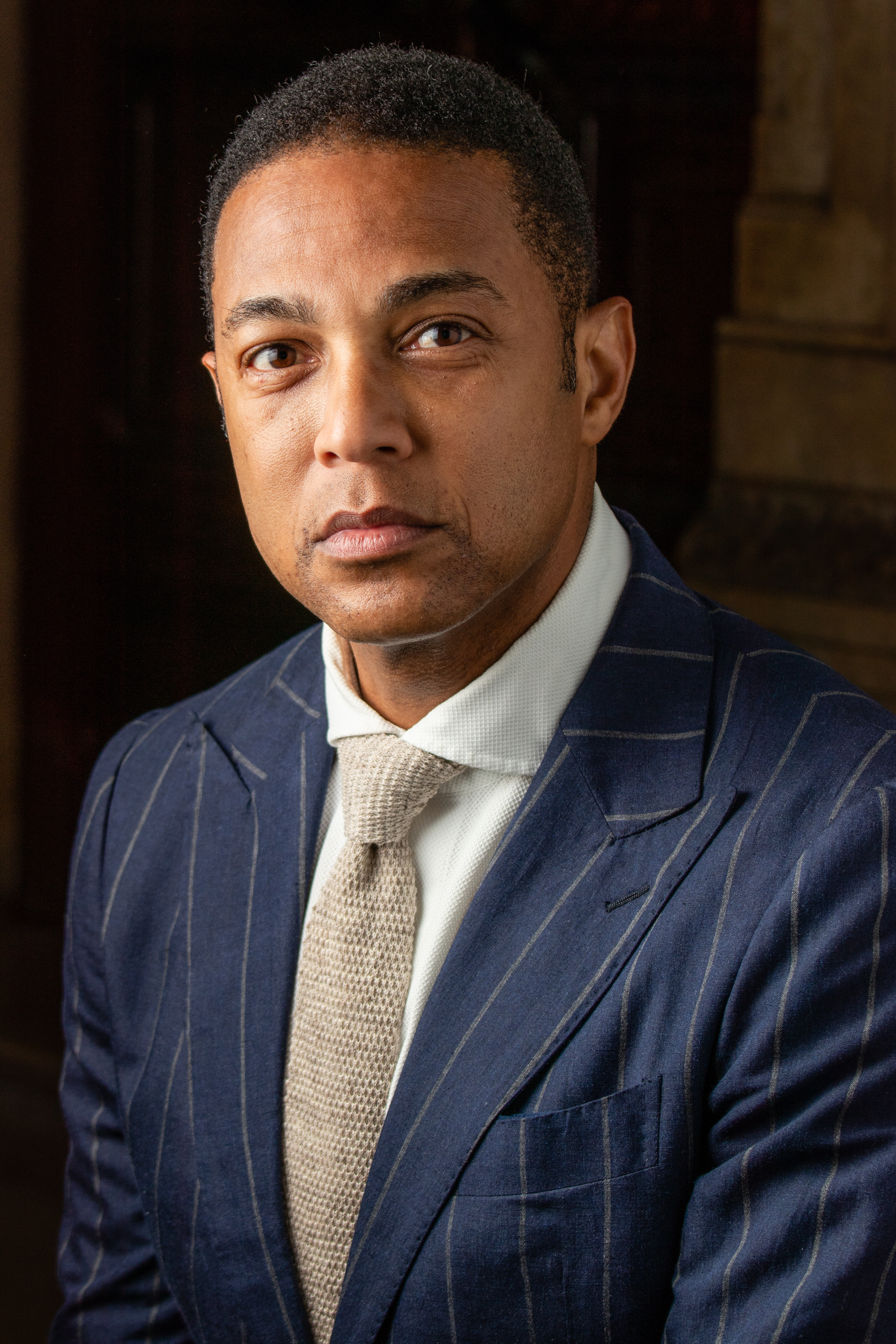
Don Lemon

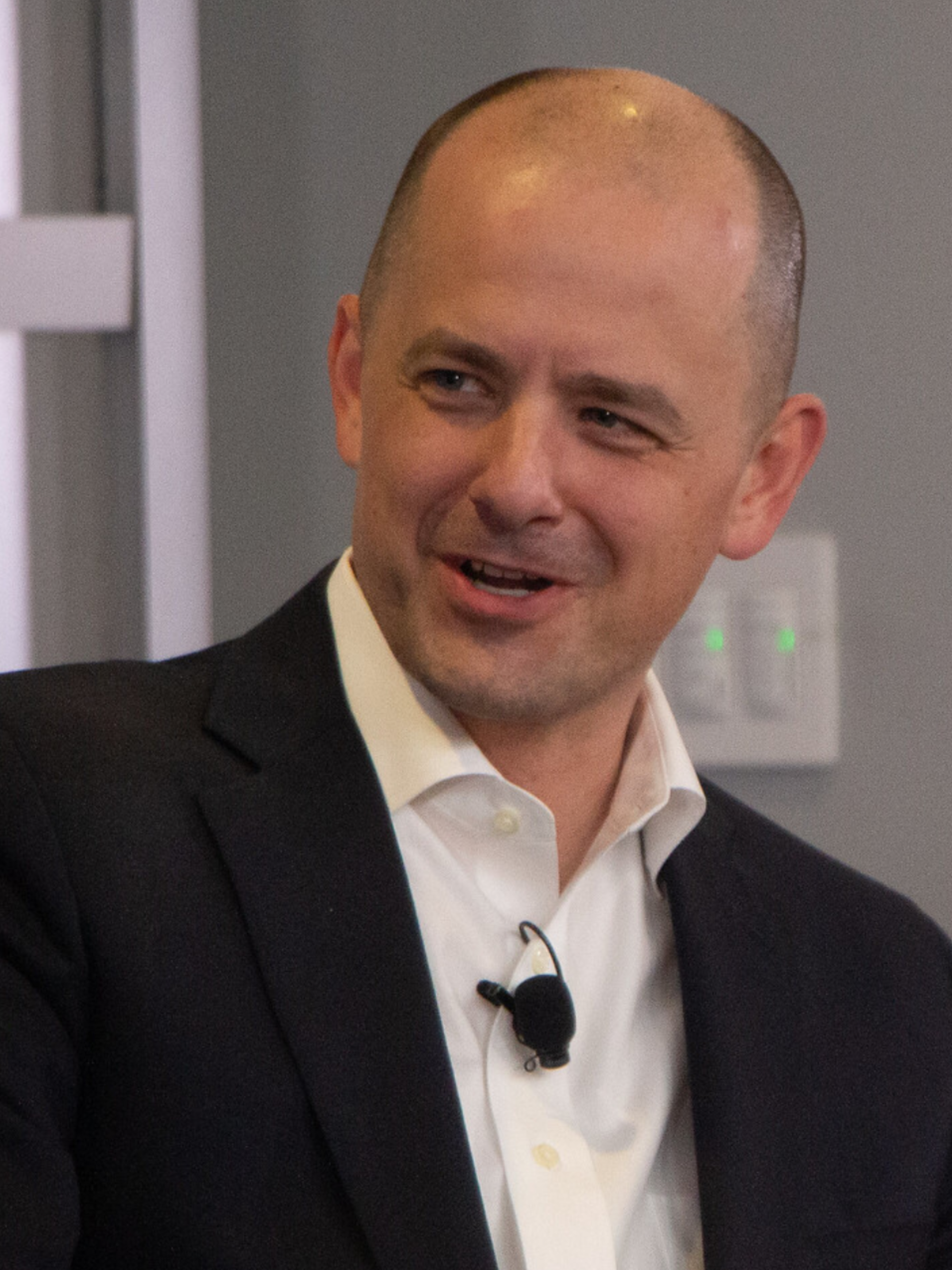
Evan McMullin

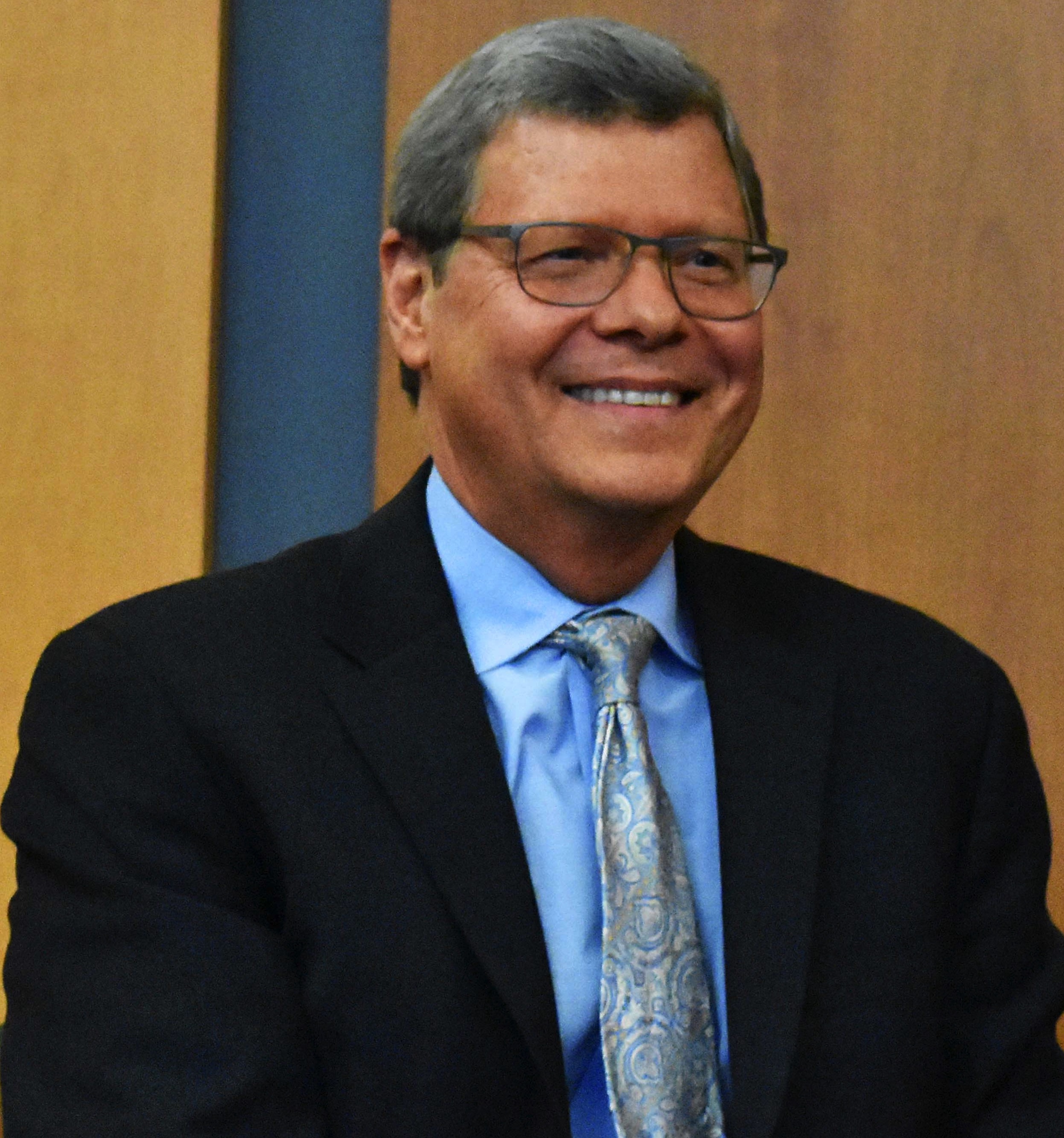
Charlie Sykes

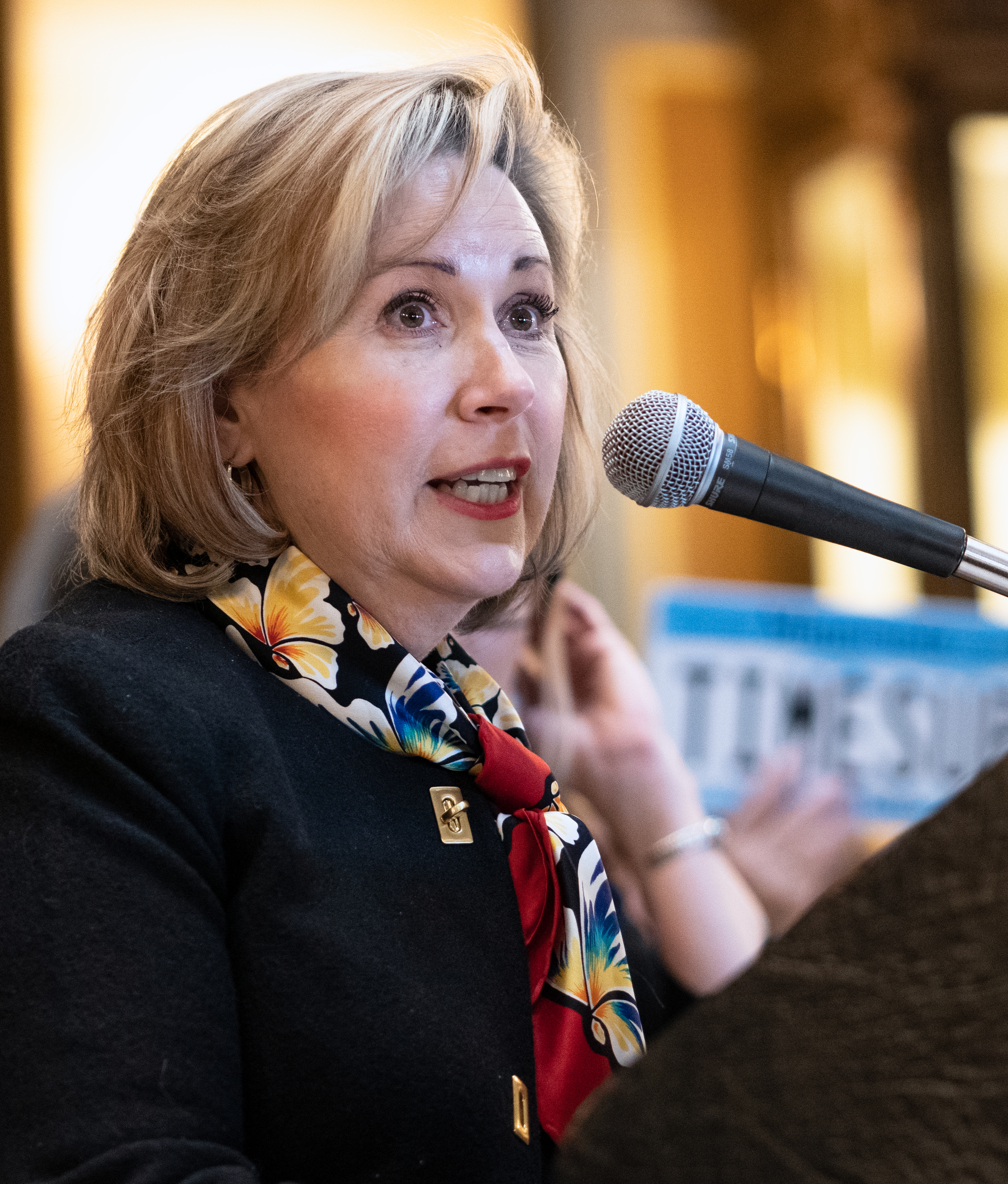
Gwen Walz

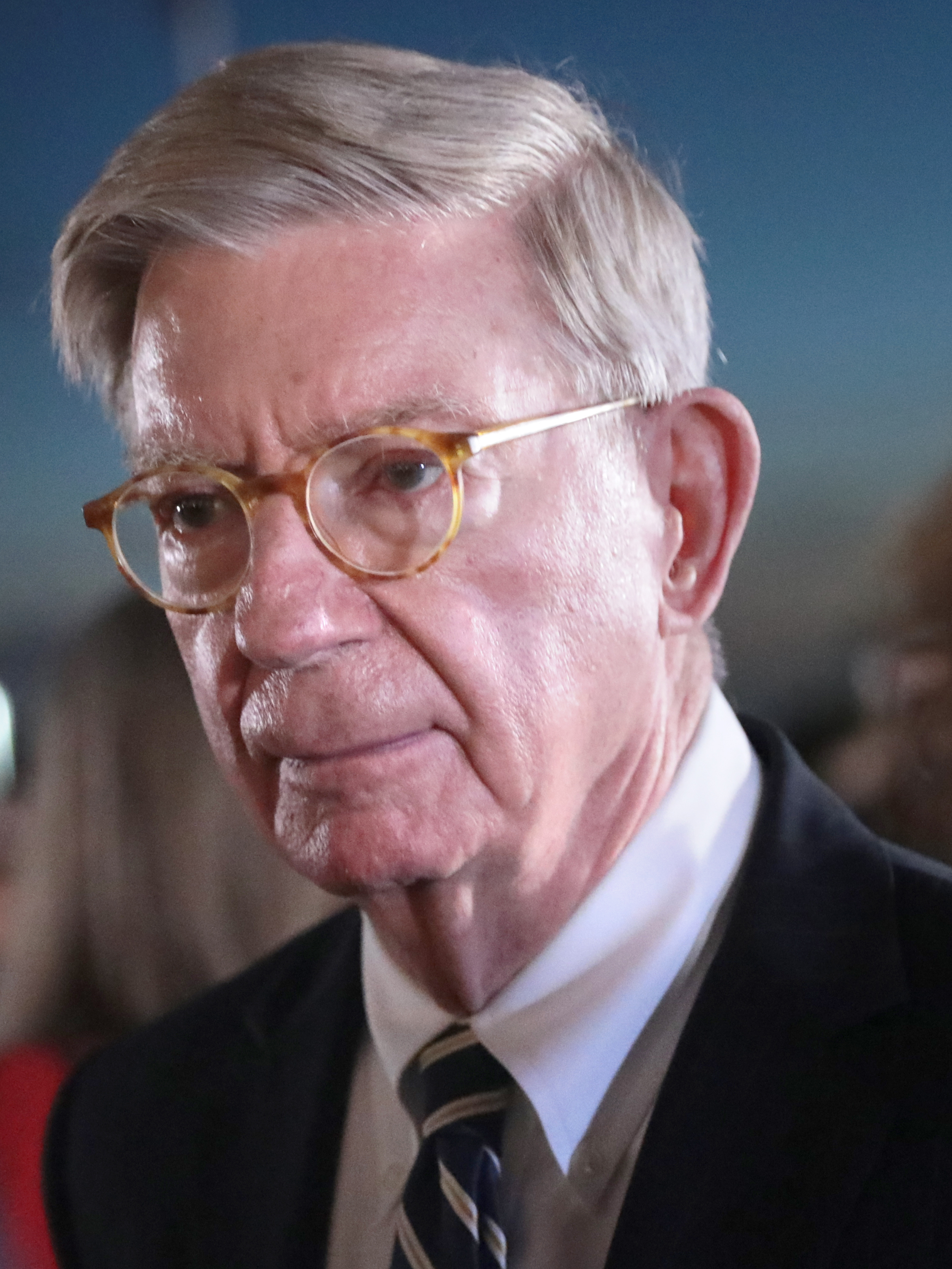
George Will

- Ammar Abdulhamid, Syrian-American human rights activist
- Susan Albright, retired journalist
- Jonathan Alter, journalist
- Kary Antholis, publisher and editor of CrimeStory.com
- Binyamin Appelbaum, journalist, editorial board member of The New York Times
- Bettina Aptheker, radical feminist and civil rights activist
- Jenna Arnold, co-founder of ORGANIZE
- Karen Attiah, writer, columnist for The Washington Post
- John Avlon, former CNN reporter and co-founder of No Labels, 2024 Democratic nominee for NY-01
- Zoë Baird, former CEO and president of the Markle Foundation
- Susan Ford Bales, chairwoman of the Betty Ford Center, daughter of President Gerald Ford (Republican)
- Kate Bassett, journalist
- Zahara Monique Bassett, CEO of Life Is Work
- Nicholas F. Benton, editor of the Falls Church News-Press
- María Antonietta Berriozábal, activist
- Catherine Bertini, executive director of the World Food Programme (1992–2002) (Republican)
- Jill Biden, educator, First Lady of the United States (2021–2025), Second Lady of the United States (2009–2017)
- Clara Bingham, journalist
- Rachel Bitecofer, political scientist, founder of Strike Pac
- John Boyd, civil rights activist, founder of the National Black Farmers Association
- Elaine Brown, prison activist (Green)
- LaTosha Brown, co-founder of Black Voters Matter
- Joan Browning, Freedom Rider, civil rights activist
- Victoria Brownworth, journalist
- Christopher Buckley, author and political satirist
- Sarah D. Bunting, writer, journalist
- Tarana Burke, activist who started the MeToo movement
- Barbara Pierce Bush, activist, daughter of President George W. Bush, and granddaughter of President George H. W. Bush (Independent)
- Chasten Buttigieg, teacher, author, and LGBT+ activist
- Jasmyne Cannick, journalist
- Amanda Carpenter, political advisor (Republican)
- James Carville, political consultant
- Rosie Castro, civil rights activist
- Sona Charaipotra, entertainment and lifestyle journalist
- Mona Charen, columnist (Republican)
- Connie Chung, journalist
- Kendall Ciesemier, founder of Kids Caring 4 Kids
- Eleanor Clift, political journalist
- Chelsea Clinton, author and daughter of President Bill Clinton
- Charlotte Clymer, press secretary and activist
- Rebecca Cokley, disability rights activist
- Brian Tyler Cohen, political commentator
- Katie Couric, journalist
- Kimberlé Crenshaw, civil rights advocate
- Brittany Packnett Cunningham, activist and co-founder of Campaign Zero
- Stephanie Cutter, political consultant
- Ronald Daniels, president of the Institute of the Black World 21st Century, 1992 candidate for president (Peace and Freedom Party)
- Leah D. Daughtry, political activist, Christian minister
- Angela Davis, political activist, philosopher, academic, and author
- Mandana Dayani, marketing and brand expert, co-founder of I Am a Voter
- Glennon Doyle, author and queer activist
- Harry Dunn, former U.S. Capitol Police officer
- Hazel Nell Dukes, former president of NAACP
- Hadley Duvall, advocate for reproductive freedom and abortion rights
- Faith Spotted Eagle, advocate against the Keystone XL pipeline
- Aalayah Eastmond, advocate for gun violence prevention, survivor of the Stoneman Douglas High School shooting
- Jonathan Eig, journalist and biographer
- Sean Eldridge, political activist, founder and president of Stand Up America
- Edward Enninful, Ghanaian-born British editor
- Myrlie Evers-Williams, civil rights activist, former chair of the NAACP
- Angela Ferrell-Zabala, executive director of Moms Demand Action
- Shomari Figures, 2024 Democratic nominee for AL-02
- Leta Hong Fincher, journalist
- Viola Fletcher, author and survivor of the Tulsa Race massacre
- Deja Foxx, reproductive rights activist
- Thomas Friedman, political commentator
- David Frum, political commentator (Republican)
- Quentin Fulks, campaign manager, political strategist, Harris's principal deputy campaign manager
- Neal Gabler, journalist
- Nicholas Gage, investigative journalist
- Scott Galloway, public speaker and author
- Alida Garcia, vice president of advocacy for FWD.us
- Wawa Gatheru, climate justice activist
- Roxane Gay, writer, professor, editor, and social commentator
- Hope Giselle, transgender activist and author
- Malcolm Gladwell, author, journalist, and public speaker
- Caroline Gleich, environmentalist, 2024 candidate for Senate in Utah
- Aquilino Gonell, former U.S. Capitol Police sergeant
- Bruce S. Gordon, former president and CEO of the NAACP
- Jaime Green, mental health advocate, First Lady of Hawaii (2022–present)
- Leah Greenberg, co-founder of the Indivisible movement
- Miss Major Griffin-Gracy, author and transgender rights activist
- Chad Griffin, LGBT rights activist, founding president of the American Foundation for Equal Rights, and former president of Human Rights Campaign
- Fred Guttenberg, activist against gun violence
- D. D. Guttenplan, writer, editor of The Nation
- Meena Harris, author and theater producer (Harris's niece)
- Christy Haubegger, founding editor of Latina
- Wenonah Hauter, environmental organizer, executive director of Food & Water Watch
- Jamie Henn, climate activist, founder and director of Fossil Free Media
- Carl Hiaasen, journalist
- Maria Hinojosa, journalist and host of Latino USA
- David E. Hoffman, journalist, staff writer at The Washington Post
- David Hogg, gun control activist and survivor of the Parkland high school shooting
- Ilyse Hogue, former president of NARAL Pro-Choice America
- Anna Holmes, writer, founder of Jezebel
- Al Hunt, journalist
- Anna Igler, obstetrician and gynecologist and reproductive freedom advocate
- Marjorie Ingall, writer for Tablet
- Jeneen Interlandi, writer, editorial board member of The New York Times
- Elizabeth Jagger, Equal Rights Amendment advocate
- Gordon C. James, PR professional
- Ben Jealous, civil rights leader and environmentalist, executive director of the Sierra Club
- Carol Jenkins, women's rights activist, author, television host, and former television journalist
- Van Jones, political analyst, author, and civil rights advocate
- Alexis McGill Johnson, CEO and president of Planned Parenthood
- Molly Jong-Fast, writer
- Olivia Julianna, political activist, abortion rights advocate, and political strategist
- Karla Jurvetson, vice chair of EMILY's List
- David A. Kaplan, journalist
- Fred Kaplan, journalist for Slate
- Gene Karpinski, president of the League of Conservation Voters
- Cameron Kasky, advocate against gun violence, founder of Never Again MSD
- Garry Kasparov, Russian human rights and democracy activist
- Kerry Kennedy, president of Robert F. Kennedy Human Rights and sister of former presidential candidate, Robert F. Kennedy Jr.
- Khizr Khan, father of deceased U.S. Army Captain Humayun Khan
- Neeru Khosla, co-founder and chair of the CK12 Foundation
- Sophia Kianni, social entrepreneur and climate activist, founder and president of Climate Cardinals
- Bernice King, activist and daughter of Martin Luther King Jr.
- Martin Luther King III, activist and son of Martin Luther King Jr.
- Joe Klein, political commentator
- María Teresa Kumar, president and CEO of Voto Latino
- Celinda Lake, pollster, political strategist
- Charles Lane, journalist
- Micah Lasher, incoming New York assembly member for district 69
- Risa Lavizzo-Mourey, doctor, former president and CEO of the Robert Wood Johnson Foundation
- Rodrigo Lehtinen, executive director of the National Center for Transgender Equality
- Cindi Leive, journalist
- Don Lemon, journalist, former CNN host (Independent)
- Carl Leubsdorf, columnist for The Dallas Morning News
- Ezra Levin, political activist and co-founder of the Indivisible movement
- Josh Levin, writer for Slate
- Judith Levine, co-founder of the National Writers Union
- Monica Lewinsky, advocate against cyber bullying
- Laura Lippman, journalist
- Sarah Longwell, political commentator and strategist (Republican)
- Preston Love Jr., professor, author and activist, 2024 Democratic nominee for U.S. Senate in Nebraska
- Sandra Maas, news anchor, president of Women's Museum of California
- James Mann, journalist
- Greil Marcus, writer, music journalist
- Ben Mathis-Lilley, journalist for Slate
- Kameron Leigh Matthews, co-founder of the Tour for Diversity in Medicine project
- Win McCormack, editor-in-chief of Tin House magazine
- Jess McIntosh, political strategist
- DeRay Mckesson, civil rights activist
- Bill McKibben, environmentalist
- Evan McMullin, former CIA officer and 2016 independent candidate for President (Independent)
- Diane McWhorter, journalist
- Michael Medved, conservative radio host
- Andrea Meyer, journalist
- Laura Miller, co-founder of Salon.com
- Tim Miller, political consultant and political commentator (Independent, Republican until 2020)
- Rosetta Miller-Perry, journalist
- Milverine, construction worker known for his resemblance to Wolverine
- Maurice Mitchell, activist and national director of the Working Families Party (Working Families)
- Jennifer Laszlo Mizrahi, disability rights advocate, founder of RespectAbility
- Sesha Joi Moon, executive director of The JXN Project
- Dawn Moore, mental health advocate, First Lady of Maryland (2023–present)
- Benjamin Moser, writer, contributor to The Nation
- Frank Mugisha, Ugandan LGBT advocate
- Bob Mulholland, Democratic political operative
- Janet Murguía, civil rights activist, president of UnidosUS
- Mike Murphy, political consultant (Republican)
- Tammy Murphy, First Lady of New Jersey (2018–present)
- Melanie Nathan, LGBT rights activist
- Ana Navarro, political commentator, television host (Republican)
- Sophia A. Nelson, author and journalist (Independent)
- Amanda Nguyen, founder of Rise
- Danielle Nierenberg, co-founder of Food Tank
- Rachel Noerdlinger, publicist and communications advisor to the National Action Network
- Michele Norris, journalist, opinion columnist with The Washington Post
- Nancy Northup, president of the Center for Reproductive Rights
- Michelle Obama, First Lady of the United States (2009–2017)
- Jim Obergefell, lead plaintiff in landmark civil rights Supreme Court case Obergefell v. Hodges
- Howard Opinsky, national press secretary for John McCain 2000 presidential campaign
- Wendy Osefo, political commentator
- Tara Palmeri, journalist at Puck
- Alexandra Petri, humor columnist for The Washington Post
- Jo Piazza, journalist
- Charlie Pierce, sportswriter, pundit
- Lydia Polgreen, journalist, opinion columnist at The New York Times
- Varshini Prakash, climate activist, co-founder of the Sunrise Movement
- Mónica Ramírez, activist
- Joe L. Reed, chair of the Alabama Democratic Conference
- Erin Reed, journalist and transgender rights activist
- April Reign, advocate for diversity and inclusion, founder of #OscarsSoWhite
- Cecile Richards, former president of Planned Parenthood
- Geraldo Rivera, journalist, attorney, author, and political commentator (Republican)
- Kelley Robinson, president of the Human Rights Campaign
- Rashad Robinson, civil rights leader, president of Color of Change
- Simon Rosenberg, political strangest, blogger and founder of New Democrat Network
- Kristin Rowe-Finkbeiner, co-founder and executive director of MomsRising.org
- Salman Rushdie, novelist
- Maureen Ryan, television critic
- Judith A. Salerno, president of the New York Academy of Medicine
- Mark Salter, former chief of staff to John McCain (Republican)
- Jack Schlossberg, writer, grandson of President John F. Kennedy
- Serge Schmemann, writer, editorial board member of The New York Times
- Stephanie Schriock, former president of EMILY's List
- Tara Setmayer, co-founder of the Seneca Project (Independent)
- Stephen F. Schneck, Catholic activist
- Judy Shepard, mother of Matthew Shepard, co-founder of the Matthew Shepard Foundation, LGBTQ+ activist
- Peggy Shepard, co-founder and executive director of the not-for-profit WE ACT for Environmental Justice
- Susan Sherman, editor and founder of IKON Magazine
- Aru Shiney-Ajay, climate activist, executive director of the Sunrise Movement
- Maria Shriver, journalist, First Lady of California (2003–2011) (Independent)
- Nina Simons, author, co-founder and co-CEO of Bioneers
- Amy Siskind, organizer of the We the People March
- Varun Sivaram, physicist and clean energy executive at Ørsted
- Gwendolyn Ann Smith, co-founder of Transgender Day of Remembrance
- Nadine Smith, executive director of Equality Florida
- Rebecca Solnit, author and activist
- Anastasia Somoza, disability rights advocate
- Andy Spahn, political activist, consultant, Democratic Party fundraiser
- Richard B. Spencer, neo-Nazi political commentator (Independent)
- Andrea Dew Steele, co-founder of Emerge California
- Gloria Steinem, journalist and social-political activist
- Bret Stephens, conservative columnist (Republican)
- Bill Stetson, film producer and environmental policy advisor
- Dana Stevens, film critic for Slate
- Stuart Stevens, political consultant (Independent)
- Tambra Raye Stevenson, co-founder of Women, Advancing, Dietetics and Nutrition
- Mitch Stewart, political campaign organizer
- Mac Stipanovich, lobbyist
- Stephen Stromberg, deputy opinions editor of The Washington Post
- Kieran Suckling, environmental activist, co-founder and executive director of the Center for Biological Diversity
- Charlie Sykes, editor-in-chief of The Bulwark (Republican)
- Goldie Taylor, editor-at-large of The Daily Beast
- Leah Thomas, environmental activist
- Toni Tipton-Martin, food and nutrition journalist
- Mary Kim Titla, publisher
- Mark Trahant, editor-at-large of Indian Country Today
- Mary L. Trump, psychologist, writer, and niece of former president and the 2024 Republican presidential nominee Donald Trump
- Fred Trump III, author, advocate for people with disabilities, and nephew of former president and the 2024 Republican presidential nominee Donald Trump
- Ann Tutwiler, deputy director-general of the Food and Agriculture Organization (2011–2012)
- Michael W. Twitty, writer, author of The Cooking Gene
- Thrity Umrigar, journalist
- Jessica Valenti, writer, co-founder of Feministing
- Jose Antonio Vargas, journalist
- John Della Volpe, pollster, author, and political advisor
- Joan Walsh, political pundit and journalist
- Gwen Walz, First Lady of Minnesota (2019–present)
- Dane Waters, political strategist
- Shannon Watts, gun violence prevention activist and founder of Moms Demand Action
- Peter Wehner, writer, editor for The Atlantic (Republican)
- Tarah Wheeler, cybersecurity passcode influencer
- Emil Wilbekin, journalist, media executive, and human rights activist
- Maya Wiley, president and CEO of the Leadership Conference on Civil and Human Rights
- Katharine Wilkinson, climate change activist, executive director and co-founder of the All We Can Save Project
- George Will, conservative columnist and political commentator
- Juan Williams, Panamanian-American journalist, political analyst for Fox News
- Terry Tempest Williams, author, educator and conservationist
- Rick Wilson, co-founder of The Lincoln Project (Independent)
- Korey Wise, criminal justice reform activist and one of the Exonerated Five
- Mike Wise, sports columnist
- Jeff Yang, writer, journalist, and business/media consultant
- Matthew Yglesias, blogger and journalist, co-founder of Vox
- Cathy Young, Russian-American journalist
- Kinney Zalesne, writer, political strategist
- James Zogby, founder and president of the Arab American Institute

== Business executives and leaders ==
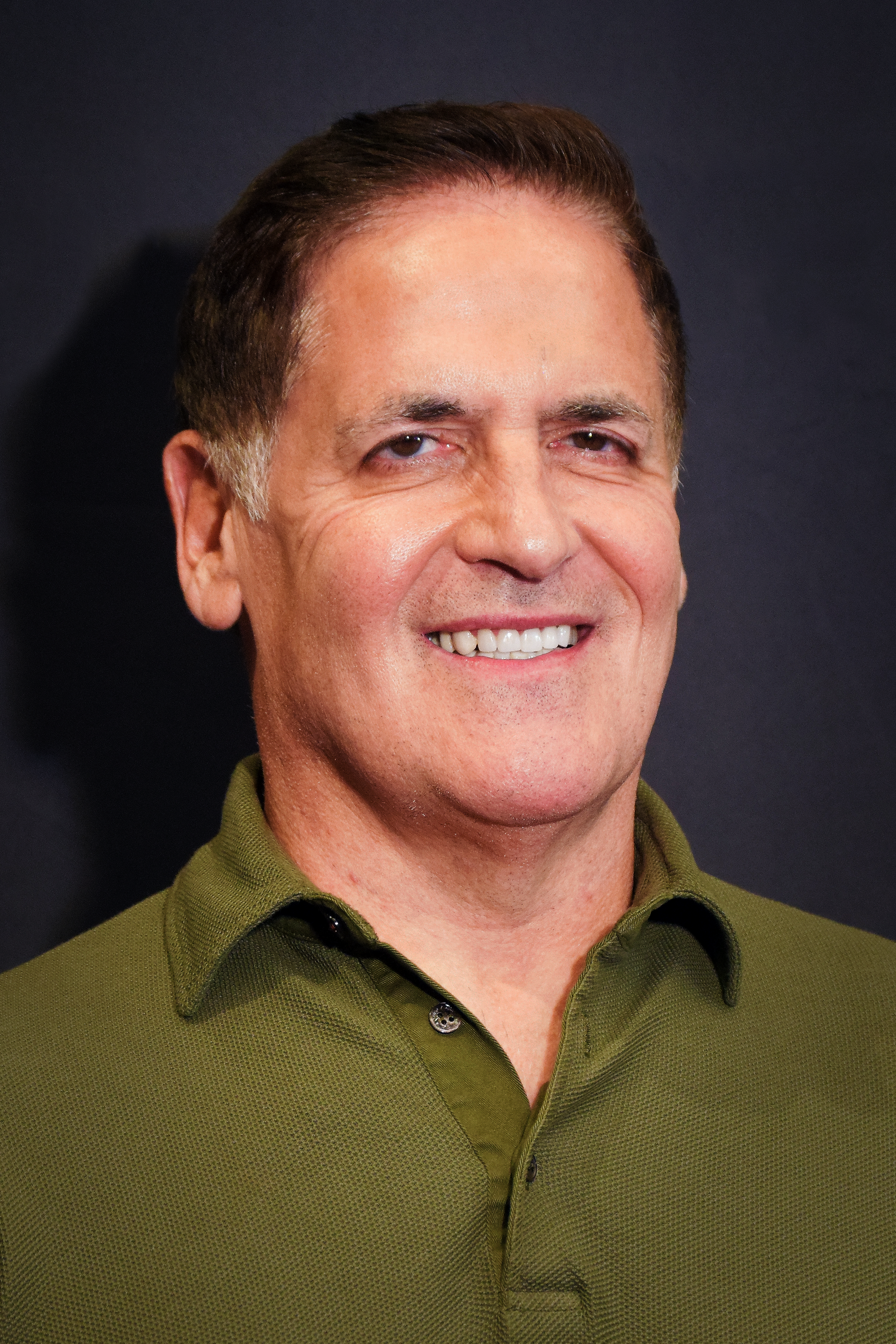
Mark Cuban

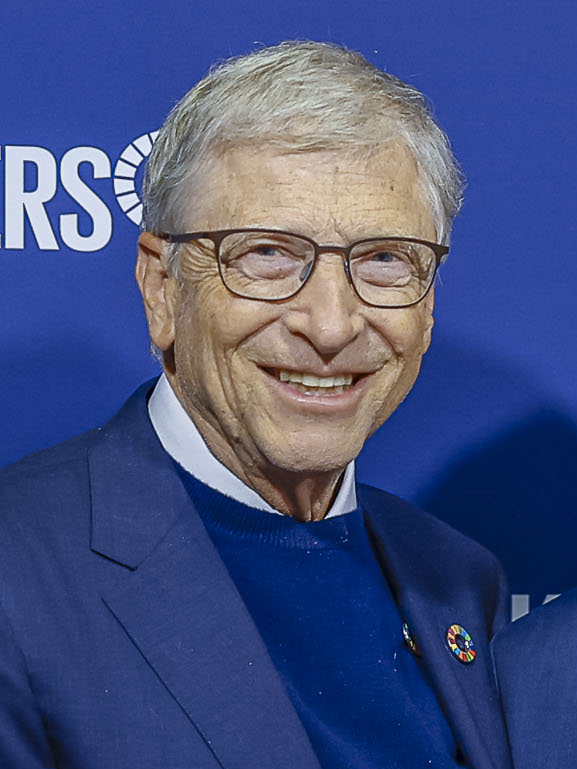
Bill Gates

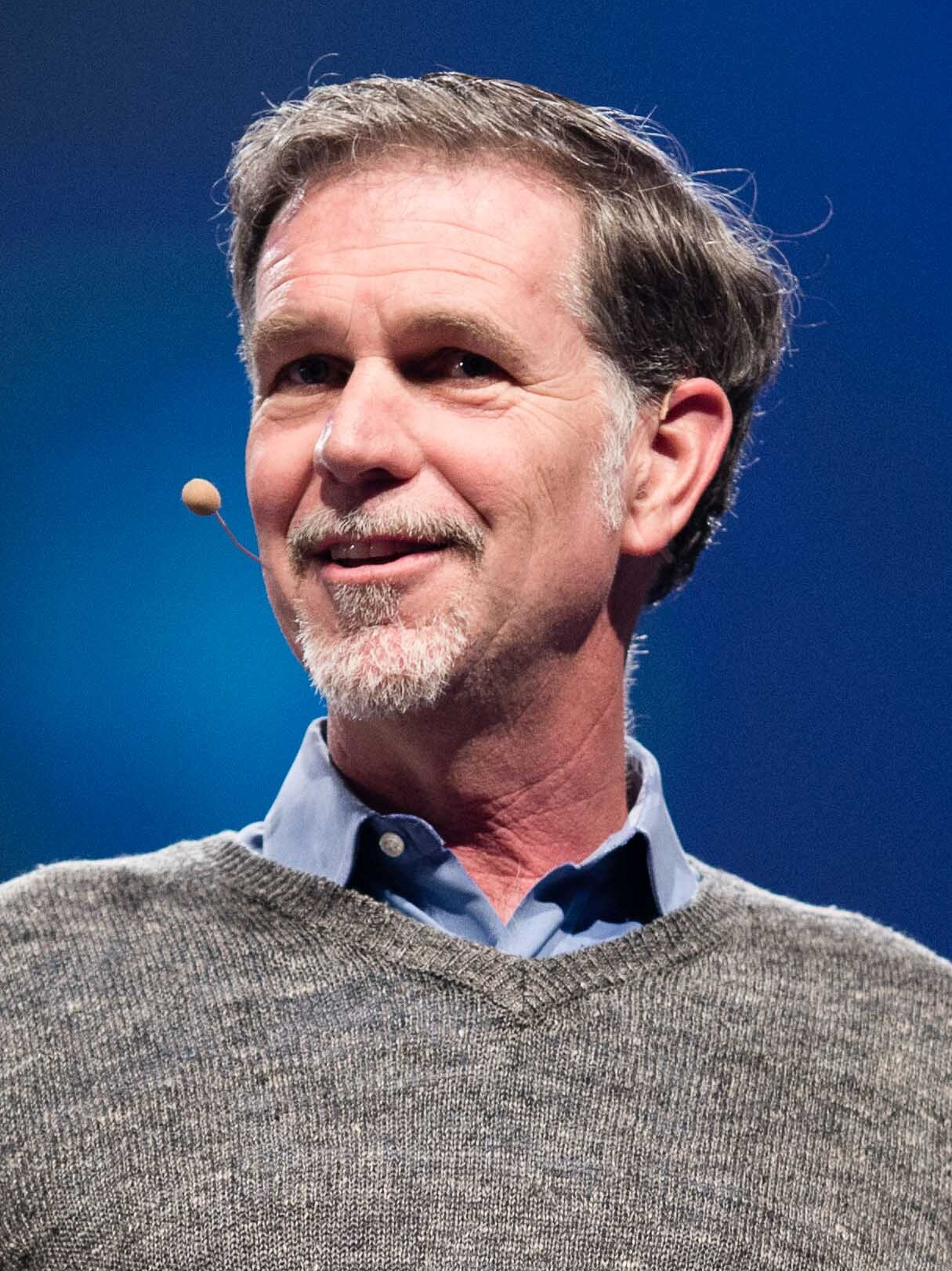
Reed Hastings

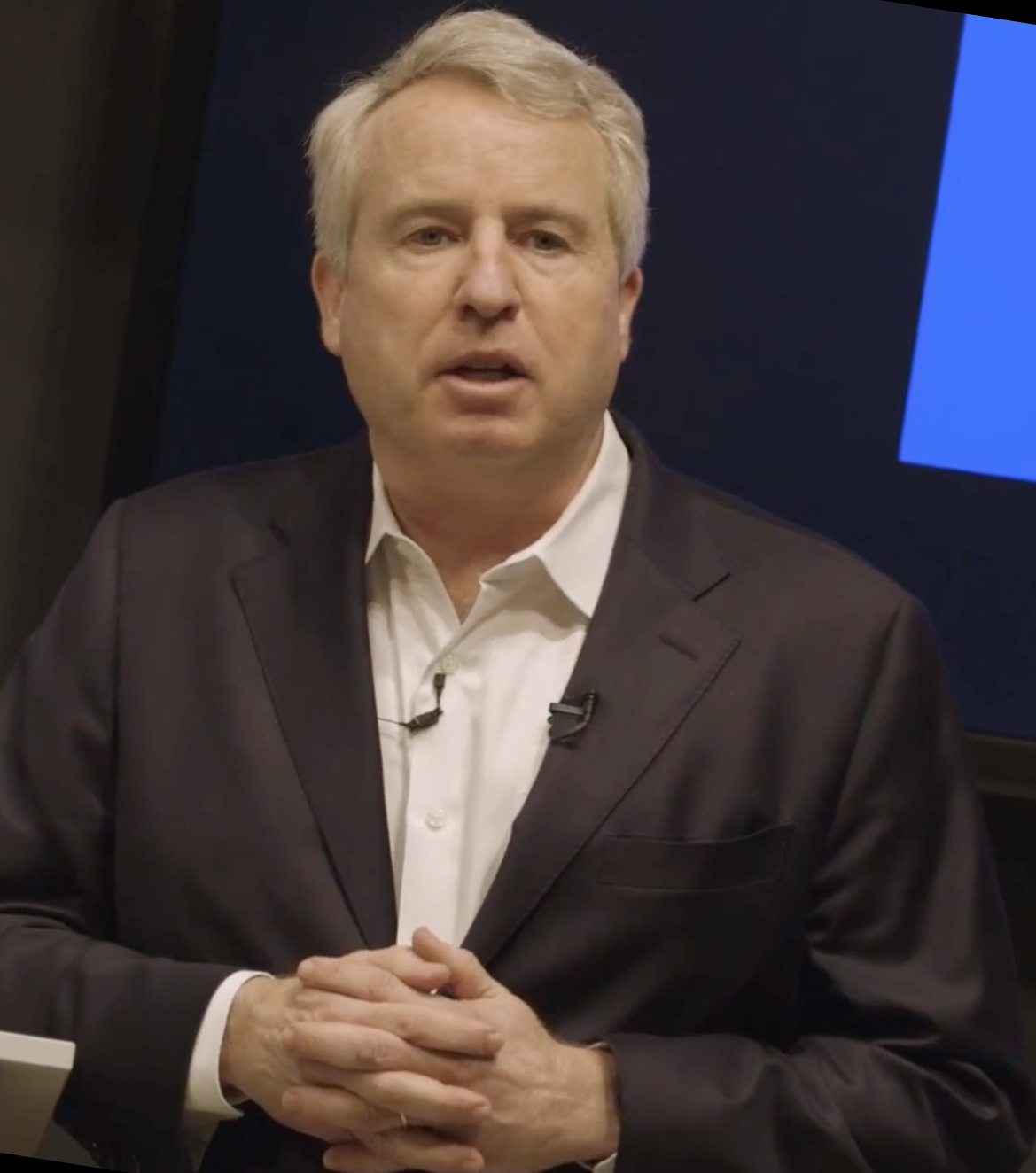
Christopher G. Kennedy

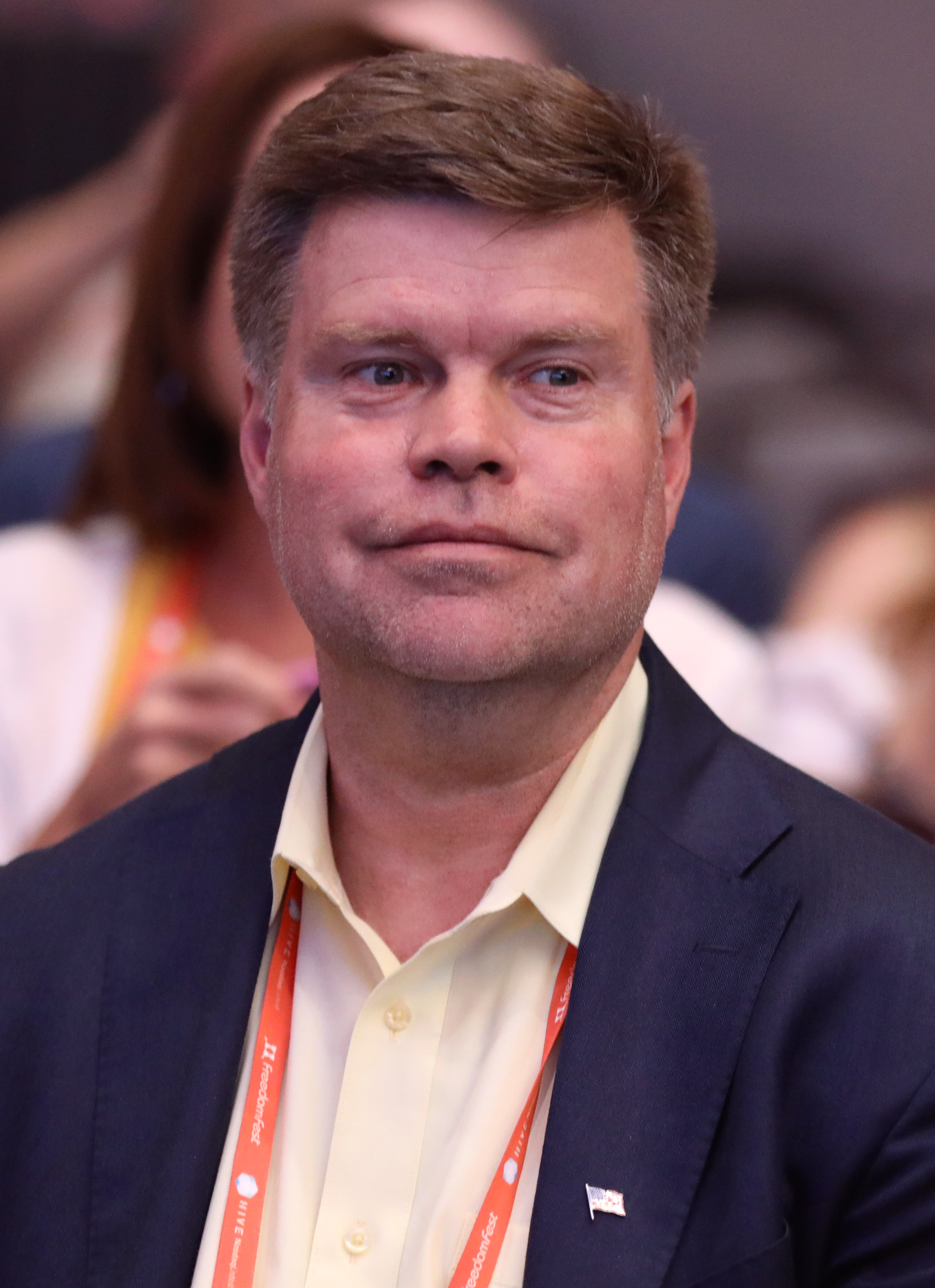
Jason Palmer

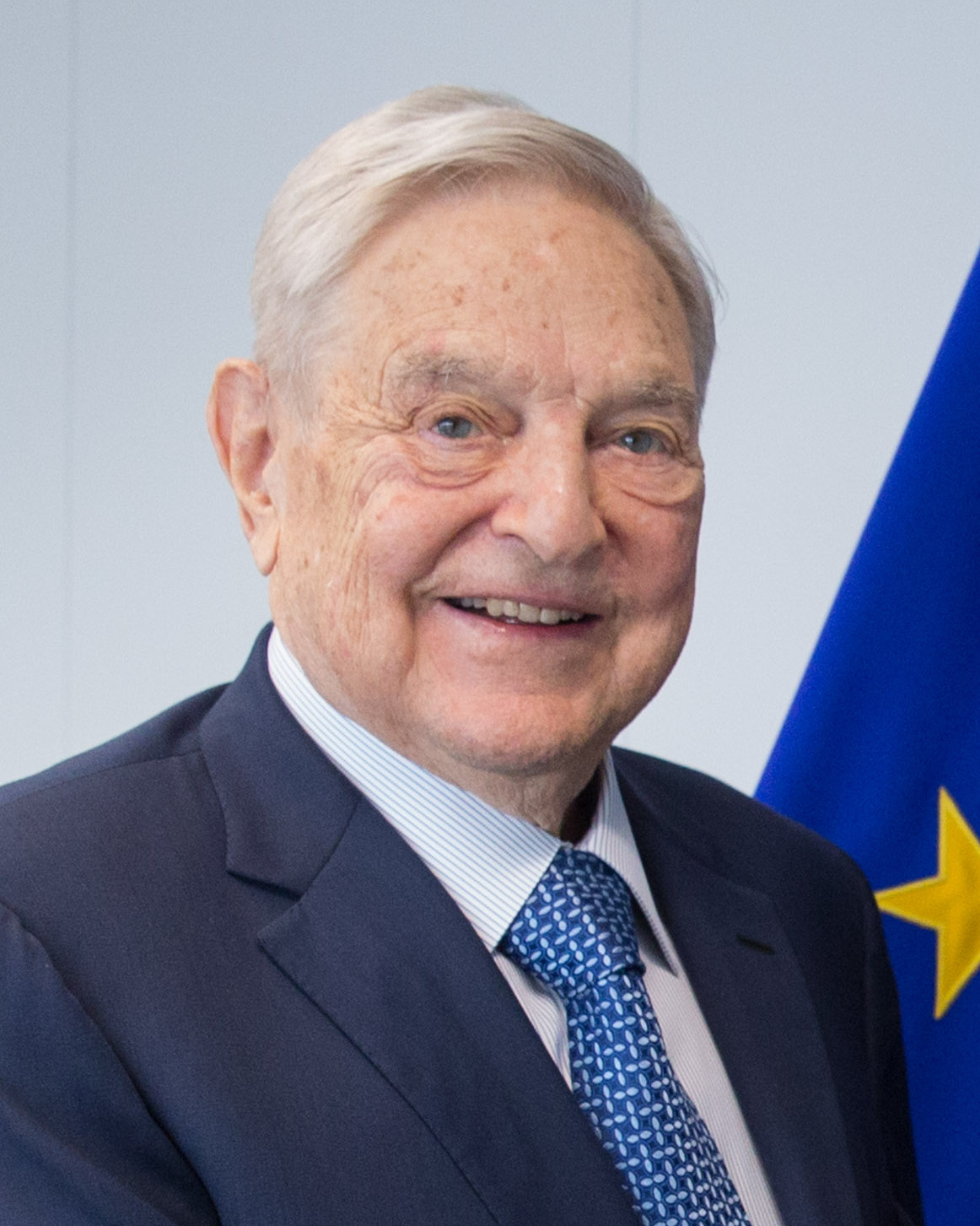
George Soros

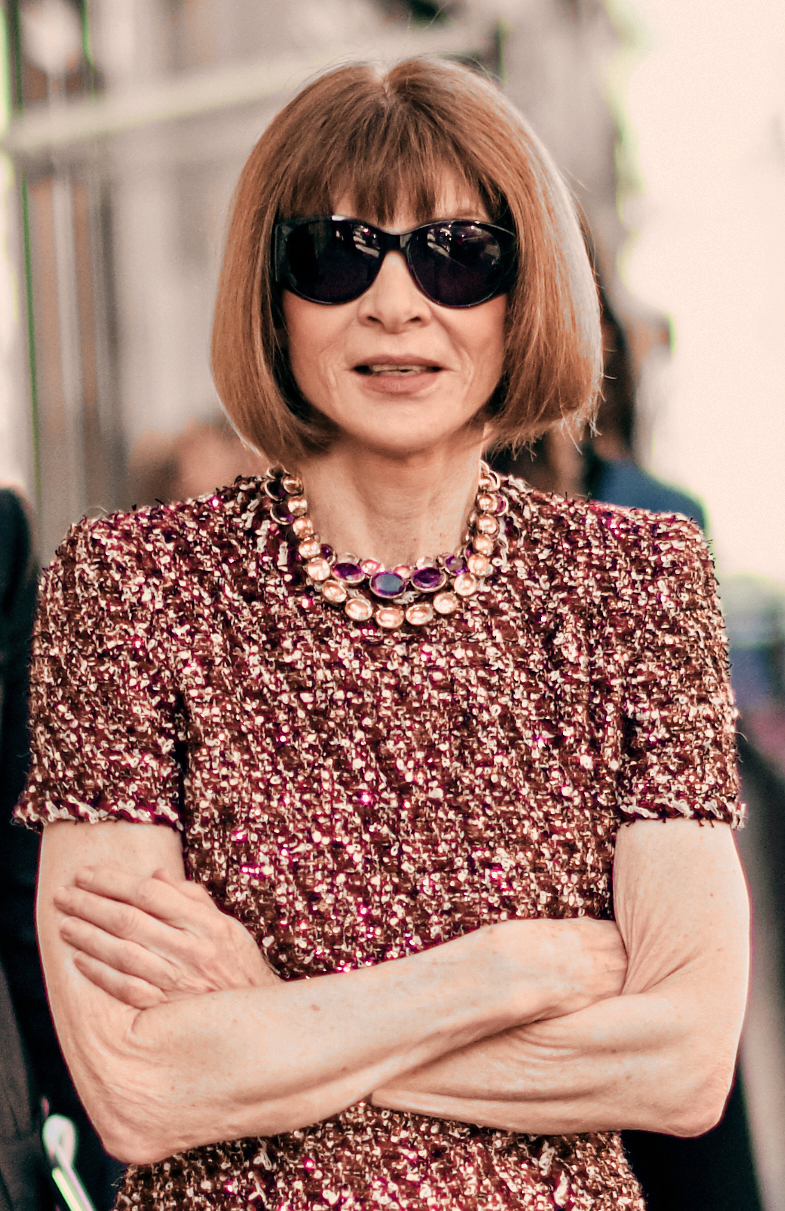
Anna Wintour

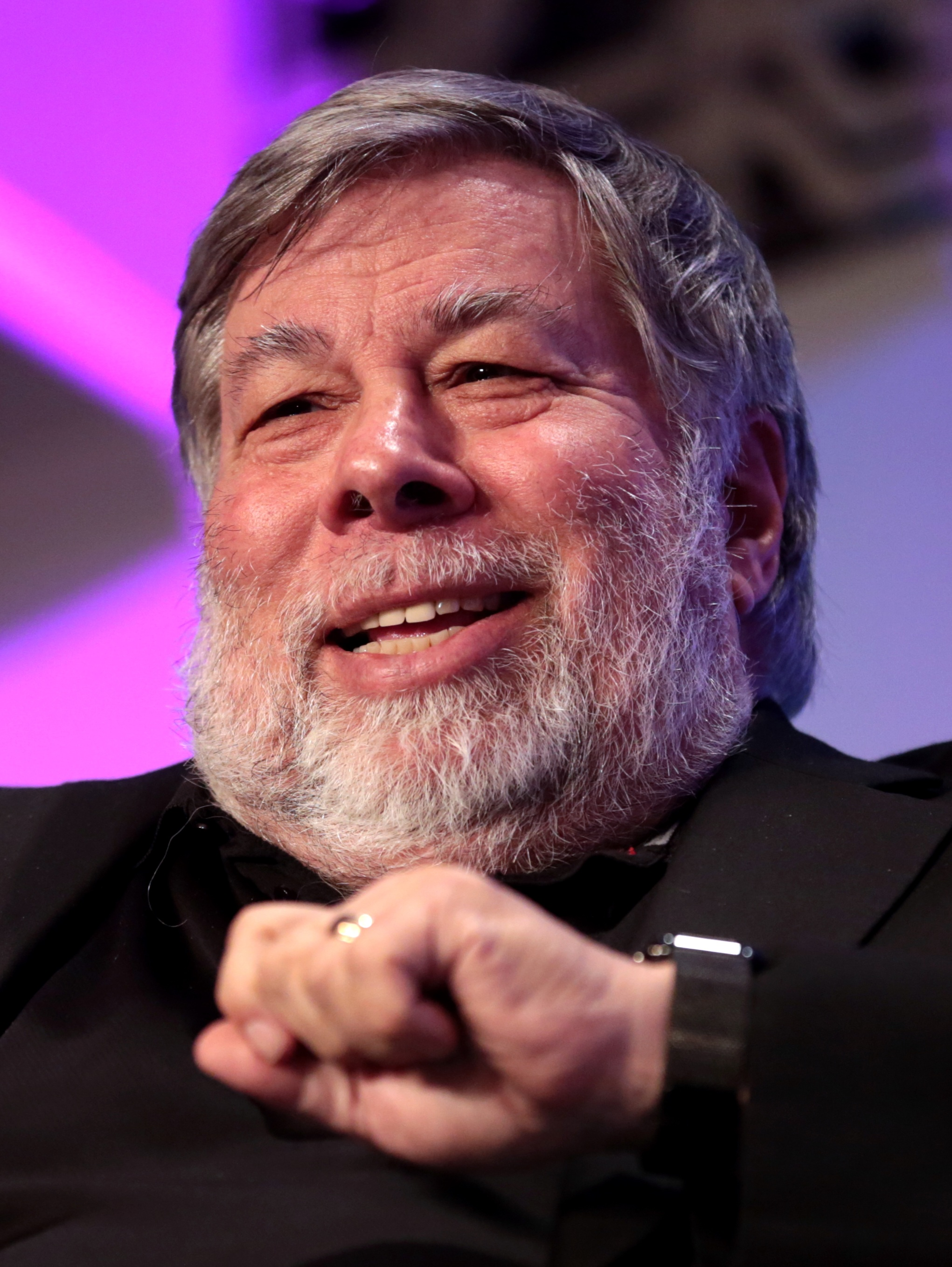
Steve Wozniak

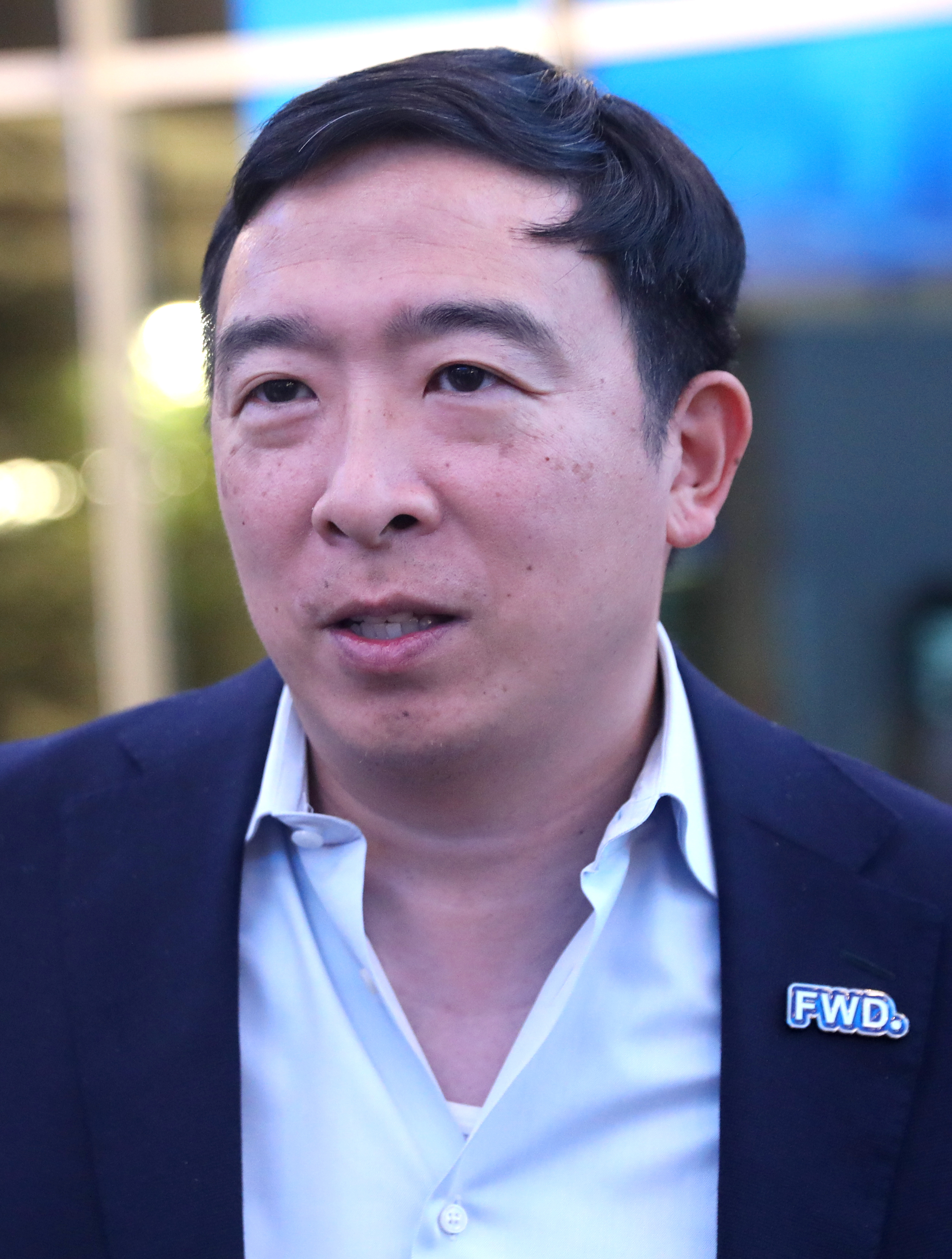
Andrew Yang

- Luis von Ahn, co-founder and CEO of Duolingo
- Shellye Archambeau, member of the Verizon board of directors
- Larry Baer, president and CEO of San Francisco Giants
- Roy Bahat, head of Bloomberg Beta
- Donnel Baird, entrepreneur, CEO and founder of BlocPower
- Carl Bass, former president and CEO of Autodesk
- Jeff Berding, co-CEO of FC Cincinnati
- Afsaneh Mashayekhi Beschloss, founder and CEO of RockCreek
- Jeff Bewkes, former chairman and CEO of Time Warner
- Arthur Blank, co-founder of Home Depot
- Scooter Braun, record executive
- Rosalind Brewer, former CEO of Walgreens Boots Alliance
- Hannah Bronfman, angel investor
- Susie Tompkins Buell, co-founder of Esprit Holdings and The North Face
- Ursula Burns, co-founder of Teneo
- Melissa Butler, founder of the Lip Bar
- Stewart Butterfield, co-founder of Flickr and Slack
- Maverick Carter, business manager of LeBron James and co-founder of SpringHill Company
- Kenneth Chenault, chairman and managing partner of General Catalyst, former president of American Express
- Stephen J. Cloobeck, founder of Diamond Resorts
- Ben Cohen, co-founder of Ben & Jerry's
- Julia Collins, food tech entrepreneur
- Tim Collins, senior managing director of Ripplewood Holdings
- Douglas Conant, former CEO of the Campbell's
- Ron Conway, venture capitalist
- W. Don Cornwell, founder of Granite Broadcasting
- Robert Crandall, former president and CEO of American Airlines
- Mark Cuban, businessperson, television personality and minority owner of Dallas Mavericks (Independent)
- Ryan Dancey, vice president of Wizards of the Coast
- Mandana Dayani, marketing and brand expert, former president of Archewell
- Morgan DeBaun, founder and CEO of Blavity Inc.
- Bob Diamond, former CEO of Barclays plc
- Abigail Disney, film producer, philanthropist, and member of the Disney family
- Barry Diller, chairman of IAC and Expedia Group
- John Doerr, chairman of Kleiner Perkins
- Arnold W. Donald, vice chairman of Carnival Corporation & plc
- Tim Draper, venture capital investor, and founder of Draper Fisher Jurvetson
- Blair Effron, financier and co-founder of Centerview Partners
- Tom Evslin, founder and chair of NG Advantage LLC (Republican)
- Fred Eychaner, chairman of Newsweb Corporation
- Leslie Feinzaig, venture capitalist and technologist
- José E. Feliciano, co-founder and managing partner of Clearlake Capital
- Mike Fernandez, founder of MBF Healthcare Partners (Independent)
- David Fialkow, co-founder of General Catalyst
- Anne Finucane, former vice chair of Bank of America
- Lynn Forester de Rothschild, chair of E.L. Rothschild
- Helena Foulkes, CEO of Hudson's Bay Company
- Kenneth Frazier, executive chairman and former CEO of Merck & Co.
- Tom Freston, former CEO of MTV Networks
- Glen S. Fukushima, attorney, business executive, philanthropist
- Mark Gallogly, private equity investor
- Bill Gates, co-founder of Microsoft
- Melinda French Gates, philanthropist
- Bill George, former chairman and CEO of Medtronic
- Jim Gianopulos, former chairman and CEO of 20th Century Fox
- Charles K. Gifford, former chairman of Bank of America
- Tom Glocer, former CEO of Thomson Reuters and Reuters
- Ellen Goldsmith-Vein, founder and CEO of the Gotham Group
- David J. Grain, CEO and managing director of Grain Management LLC
- Jonathan D. Gray, president and chief operating officer of Blackstone Group and chairman of Hilton Worldwide
- Logan Green, co-founder and former CEO of Lyft
- Jerry Greenfield, co-founder of Ben & Jerry's
- Agnes Gund, president emerita and life trustee of the MoMA
- Mimi Haas, businesswoman
- Katie Harbath, founder and CEO of Ancor Change (Republican)
- Reed Hastings, CEO of Netflix
- Noosheen Hashemi, entrepreneur and philanthropist
- Isaac Hayes III, record producer, president of Isaac Hayes Enterprises
- Christie Hefner, former chairman and CEO of Playboy Enterprises
- Mellody Hobson, co-CEO of Ariel Investments, chair of Starbucks
- Reid Hoffman, co-founder of LinkedIn
- Ben Horowitz, co-founder of Andreessen Horowitz (previously endorsed Donald Trump)
- Glenn Hutchins, co-founder of Silver Lake Partners
- Blake Irving, former CEO of GoDaddy
- Hamilton E. James, former president, COO, and executive vice chairman of Blackstone Inc.
- Pamela Joyner, art collector, member of the board of the Art Institute of Chicago
- Jeffrey Katzenberg, founder and former CEO of DreamWorks Animation
- Michael Kempner, businessman and founder of MikeWorldWide
- Christopher G. Kennedy, businessman and brother of former presidential candidate Robert F. Kennedy Jr.
- Judith Kent, business executive and philanthropist
- Vinod Khosla, venture capitalist
- Scott Kleeb, businessman
- Tina Knowles, businesswoman
- Kay Koplovitz, founder and former chairwoman and CEO of USA Network
- Ellen J. Kullman, CEO of Carbon, former chair and CEO of DuPont
- Donna Langley, chairwoman of Universal Studios
- Sherry Lansing, former chairwoman and CEO of Paramount Pictures
- Chris Larsen, investor and co-founder of Ripple Labs
- Marc Lasry, co-founder and CEO of Avenue Capital Group and former co-owner of the Milwaukee Bucks
- Aileen Lee, venture capitalist
- Ted Leonsis, founder and CEO of Monumental Sports & Entertainment
- Matthew Levatich, former CEO of Harley-Davidson
- Aaron Levie, entrepreneur and founder and CEO of Box
- Jeremy Levin, chairman and CEO of Ovid Therapeutics Inc.
- Kevin Liles, co-founder and CEO of 300 Entertainment
- Michael Lynton, chairman of Snap Inc. and Warner Music Group
- Marissa Mayer, former president and CEO of Yahoo
- Henry W. McGee, former president of HBO Home Entertainment
- Raymond McGuire, businessman, former Citigroup executive, and candidate in the 2021 New York City Democratic mayoral primary
- Scott Mills, CEO of the BET Media Group
- Dustin Moskovitz, co-founder and CEO of Asana, co-founder of Facebook
- Alan Mulally, former president and CEO of Ford Motor Company
- Anne M. Mulcahy, former chairwoman and CEO of Xerox
- James Murdoch, former CEO of 21st Century Fox
- Barry Nalebuff, co-founder of Honest Tea
- Laxman Narasimhan, former CEO of Starbucks and Reckitt
- Indra Nooyi, former chairwoman and CEO of PepsiCo
- Scott Oki, former senior vice-president of sales and marketing for Microsoft
- Les Otten, former CEO of the American Skiing Company (Republican)
- Jason Palmer, businessman, 2024 candidate for the Democratic nomination for president
- Doug Parker, former chairman and CEO of the American Airlines Group
- Sean Parker, co-founder of Napster
- Jamie Patricof, co-founder of Electric City Entertainment and Hunting Lane Films
- John E. Pepper Jr., former chairman and CEO of Procter & Gamble
- Richard C. Perry, hedge fund manager
- Charles Phillips, former CEO of Infor
- Lisa Phillips, director of the New Museum
- Laurene Powell Jobs, founder and chair of Emerson Collective and XQ Institute
- M. R. Rangaswami, software executive
- Steven Rattner, investor, chairman and CEO of Willett Advisors
- Punit Renjen, former CEO of Deloitte
- Sylvia Rhone, chair and CEO of Epic Records
- John W. Rogers Jr., chairman and co-CEO of Ariel Investments, LLC
- Jeanne Greenberg Rohatyn, owner of Salon 94
- Rachel Romer, co-founder and former CEO of Guild Education
- Jen Rubio, co-founder of Away
- Kevin P. Ryan, co-founder of Gilt Groupe, Business Insider and MongoDB Inc.
- Haim Saban, founder of Saban Entertainment
- Chris Sacca, businessperson
- Sheryl Sandberg, former COO of Meta Platforms
- Lauren Santo Domingo, entrepreneur and CBO of Moda Operandi
- Ted Sarandos, co-CEO of Netflix, Inc.
- Reshma Saujani, founder of Girls Who Code
- Thomas Schumacher, film and theatrical producer, president of Disney Theatrical Group
- Will Schwalbe, executive vice president of Macmillan Publishers
- Ramit Sethi, author, entrepreneur, and media personality
- Komal Shah, art collector, member of the San Francisco Museum of Modern Art board of trustees
- Peter Shapiro, concert promoter
- Dan Schulman, former president and CEO of Costco
- James Sinegal, co-founder and former CEO of Costco
- Brad Smith, vice chairman and president of Microsoft
- Alex Soros, chair of Open Society Foundations, philanthropist
- George Soros, investor and philanthropist
- Tom Steyer, businessman, 2020 candidate for the Democratic nomination for president
- Jeremy Stoppelman, founder and CEO of Yelp
- Garry Tan, CEO of Y Combinator
- Anthony Thomopoulos, former president of ABC Entertainment
- Laurie Tisch, investor and billionaire philanthropist
- Angelo Tsakopoulos, founder and owner of AKT Development
- Bradley Tusk, venture capitalist
- Hamdi Ulukaya, founder and CEO of Chobani
- Christy Walton, heiress of Walmart
- Ron Williams, former president and CEO of Aetna
- Anna Wintour, media executive and editor-in-chief of Vogue
- Robert Wolf, businessman and former chairman and CEO of UBS Americas
- Andrew Yang, businessman, 2020 candidate for the Democratic nomination for president, founder of the Forward Party (Forward)
- Kneeland Youngblood, co-founder of Pharos Capital Group, LLC

== Actors and actresses ==
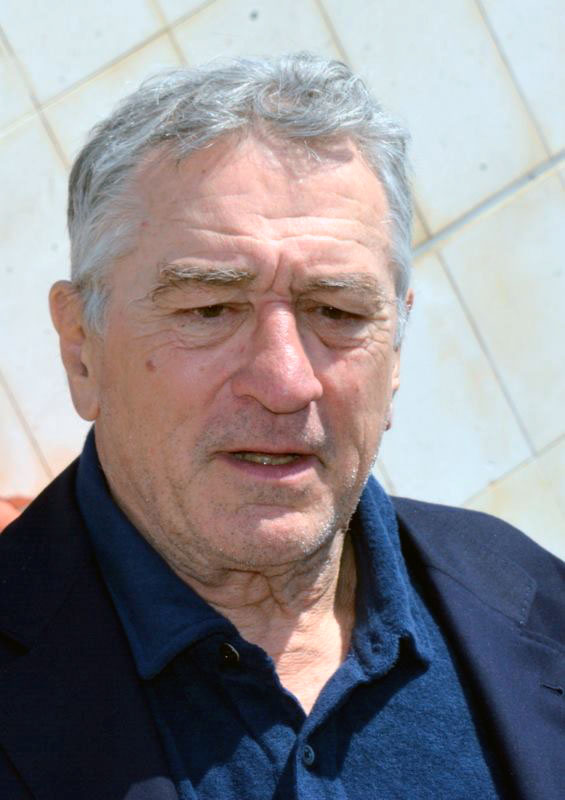
Robert De Niro

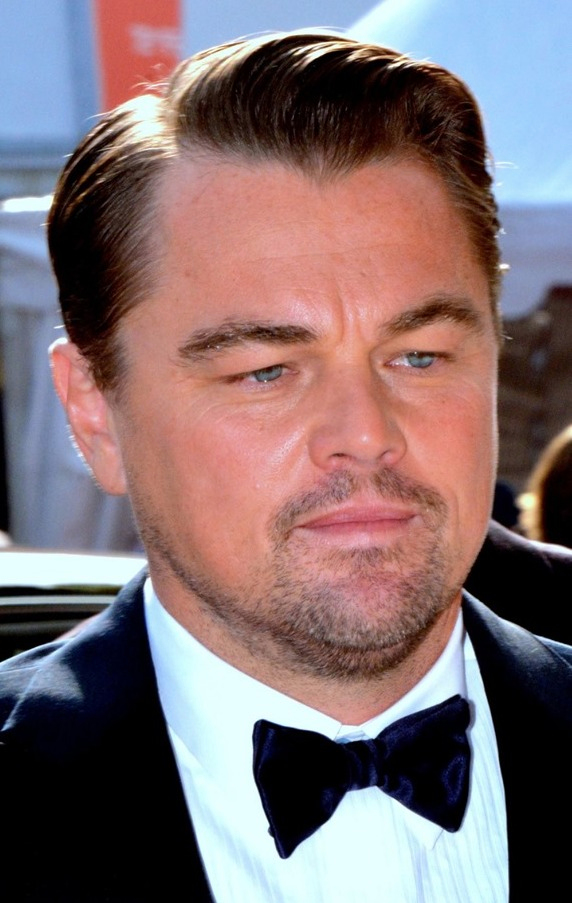
Leonardo DiCaprio

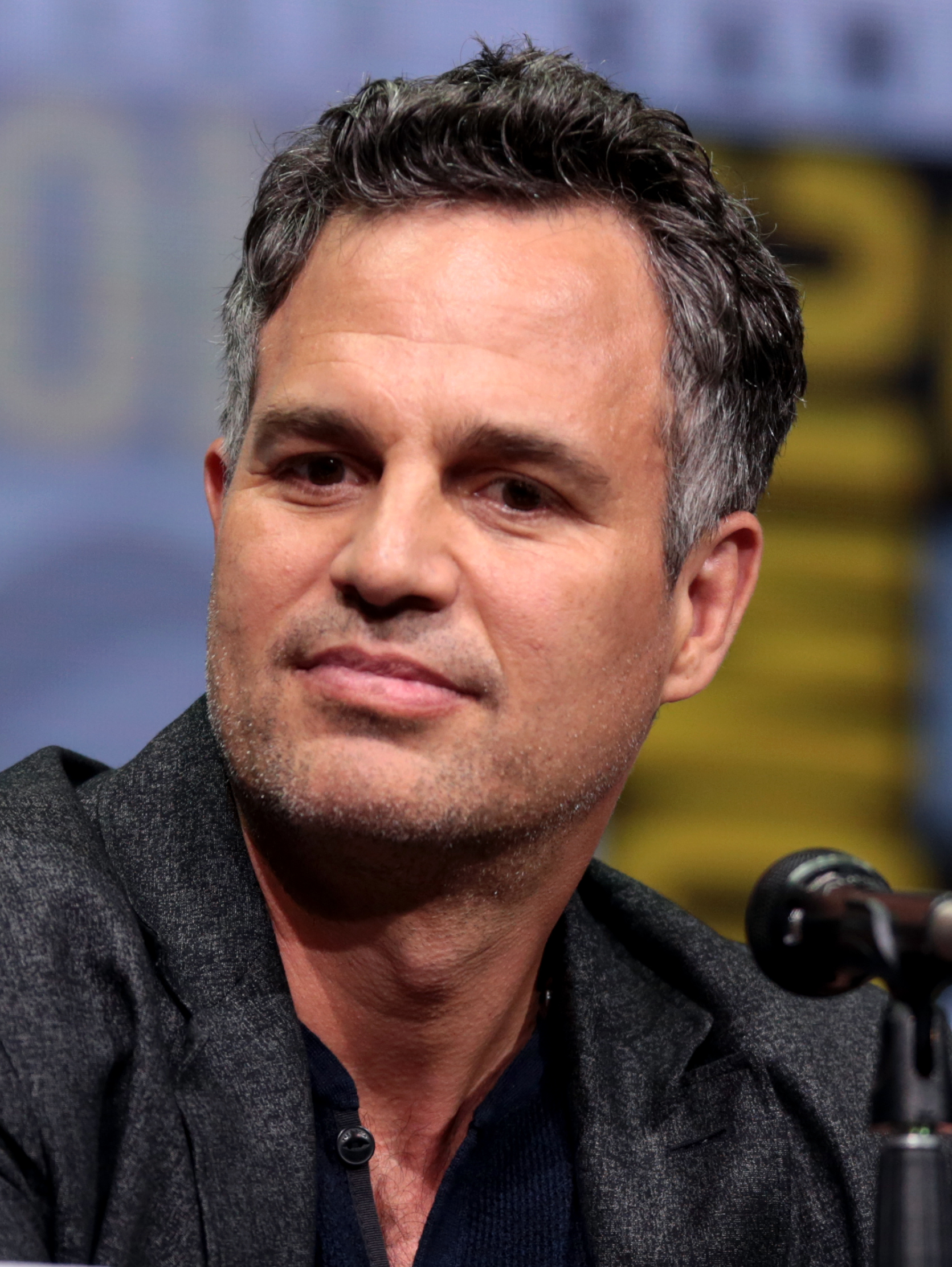
Mark Ruffalo

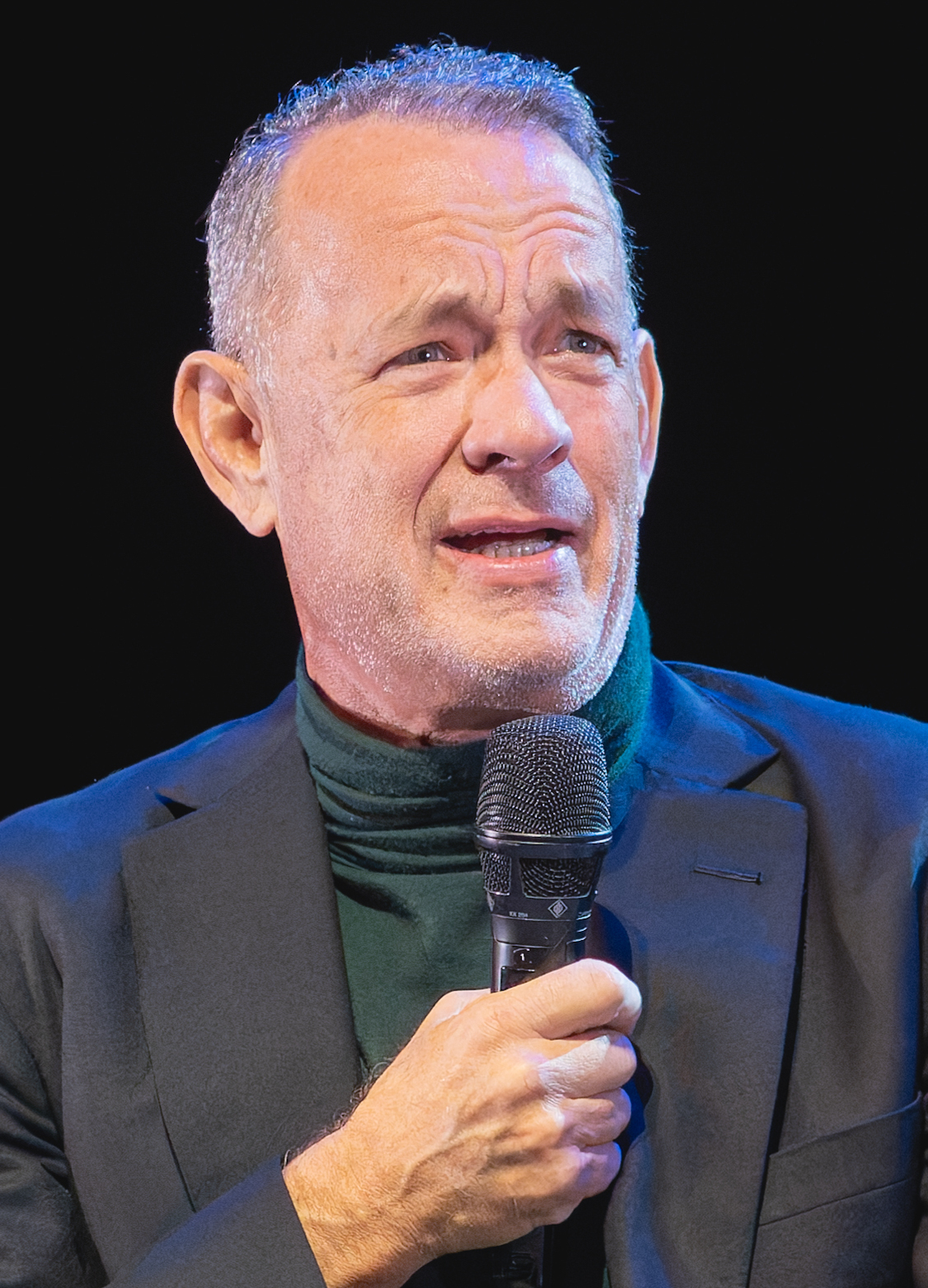
Tom Hanks

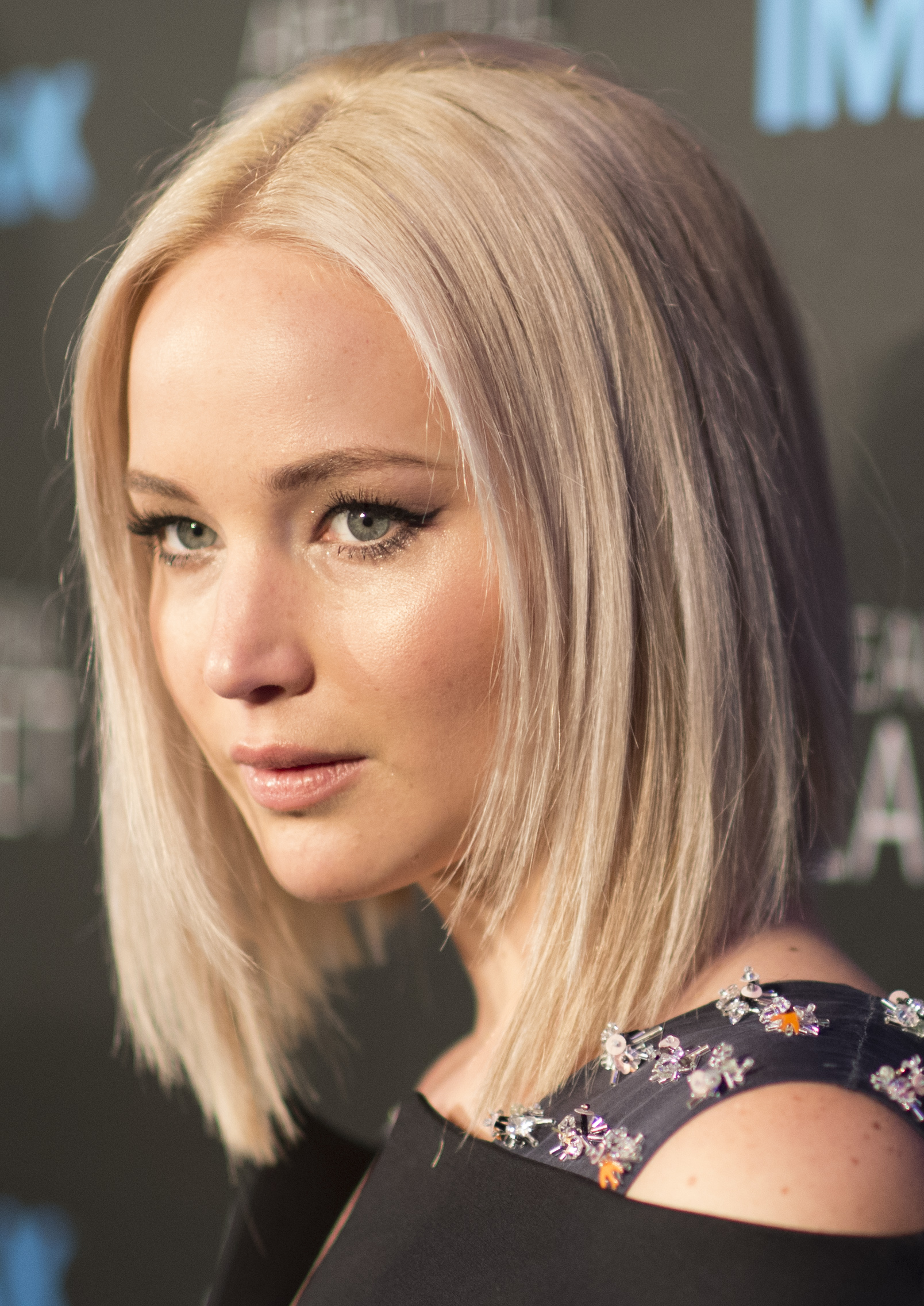
Jennifer Lawrence

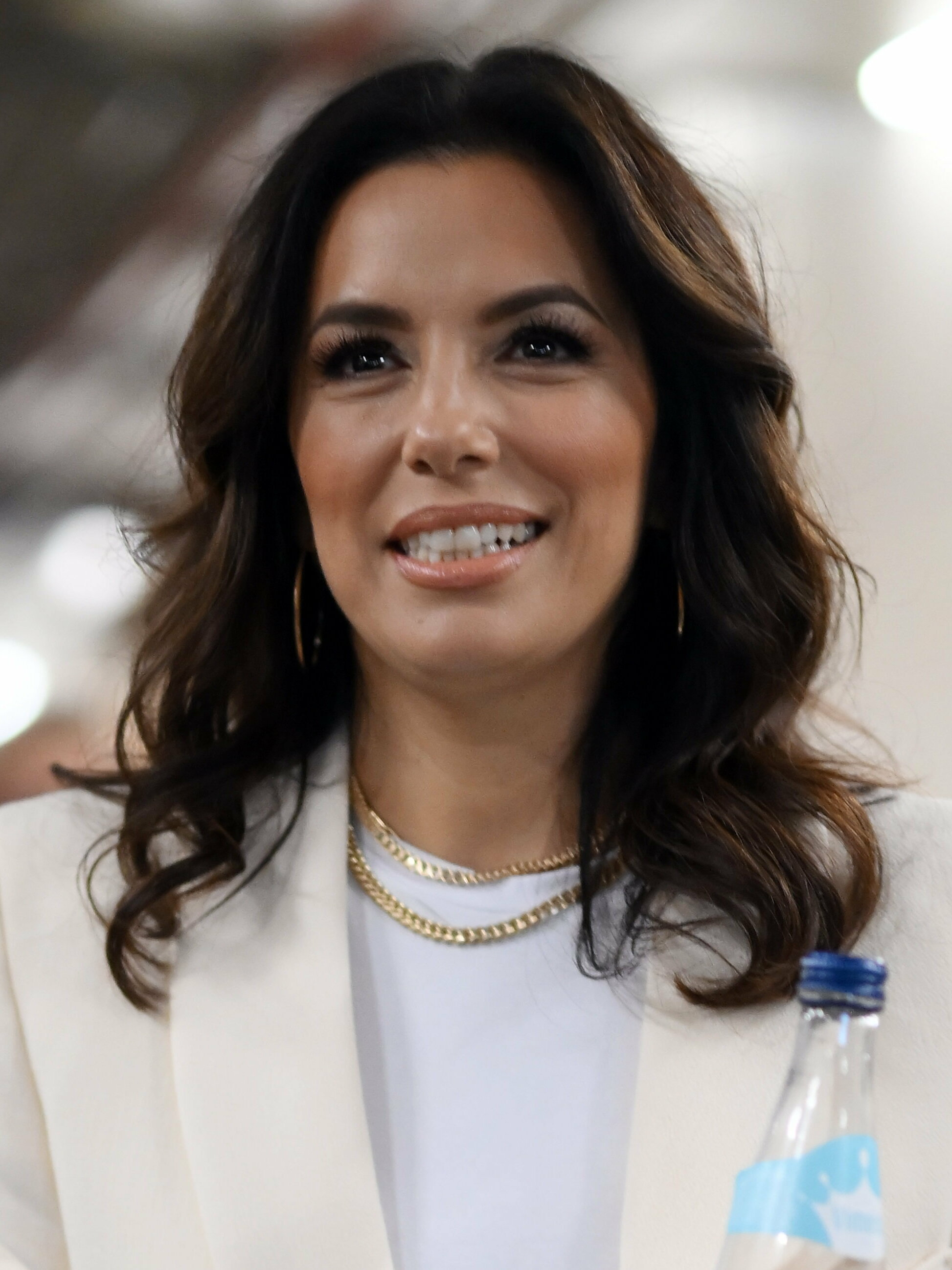
Eva Longoria

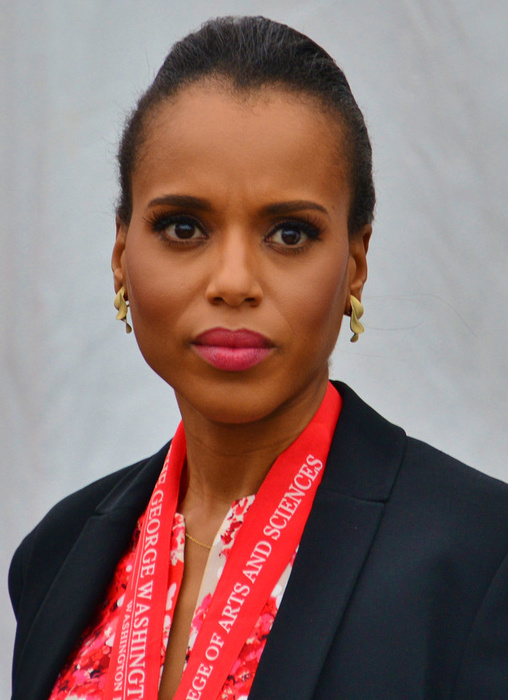
Kerry Washington

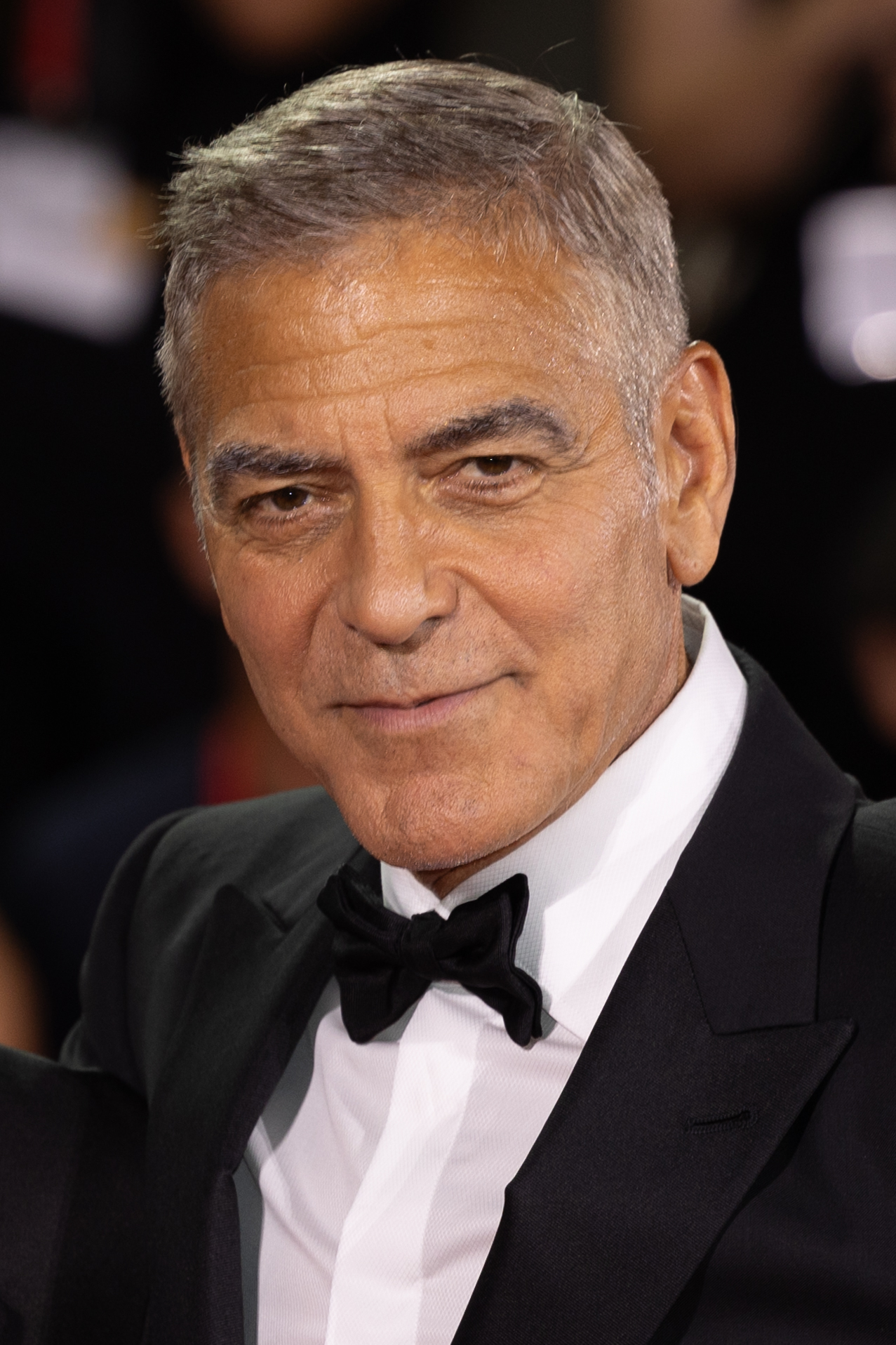
George Clooney

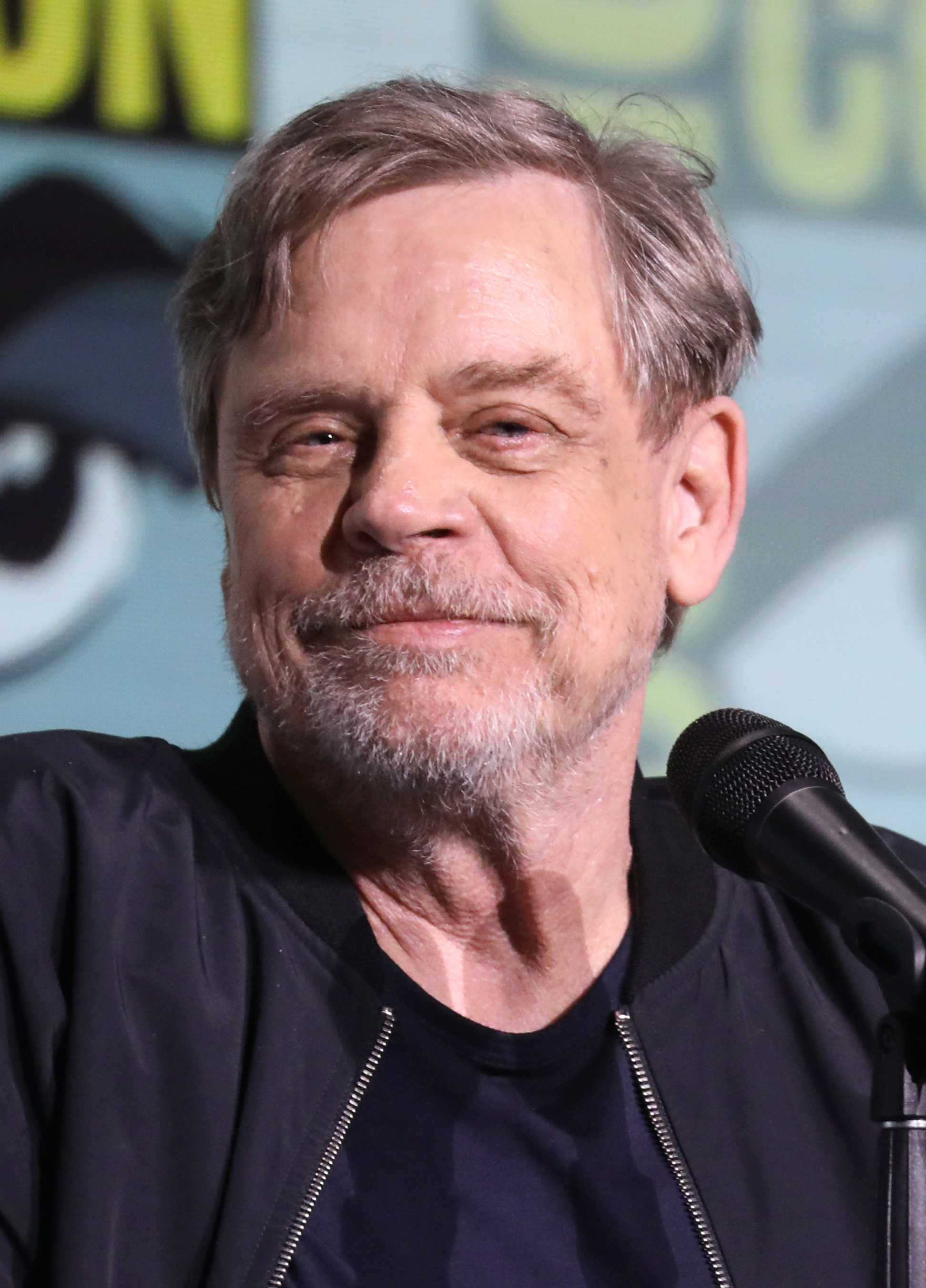
Mark Hamill

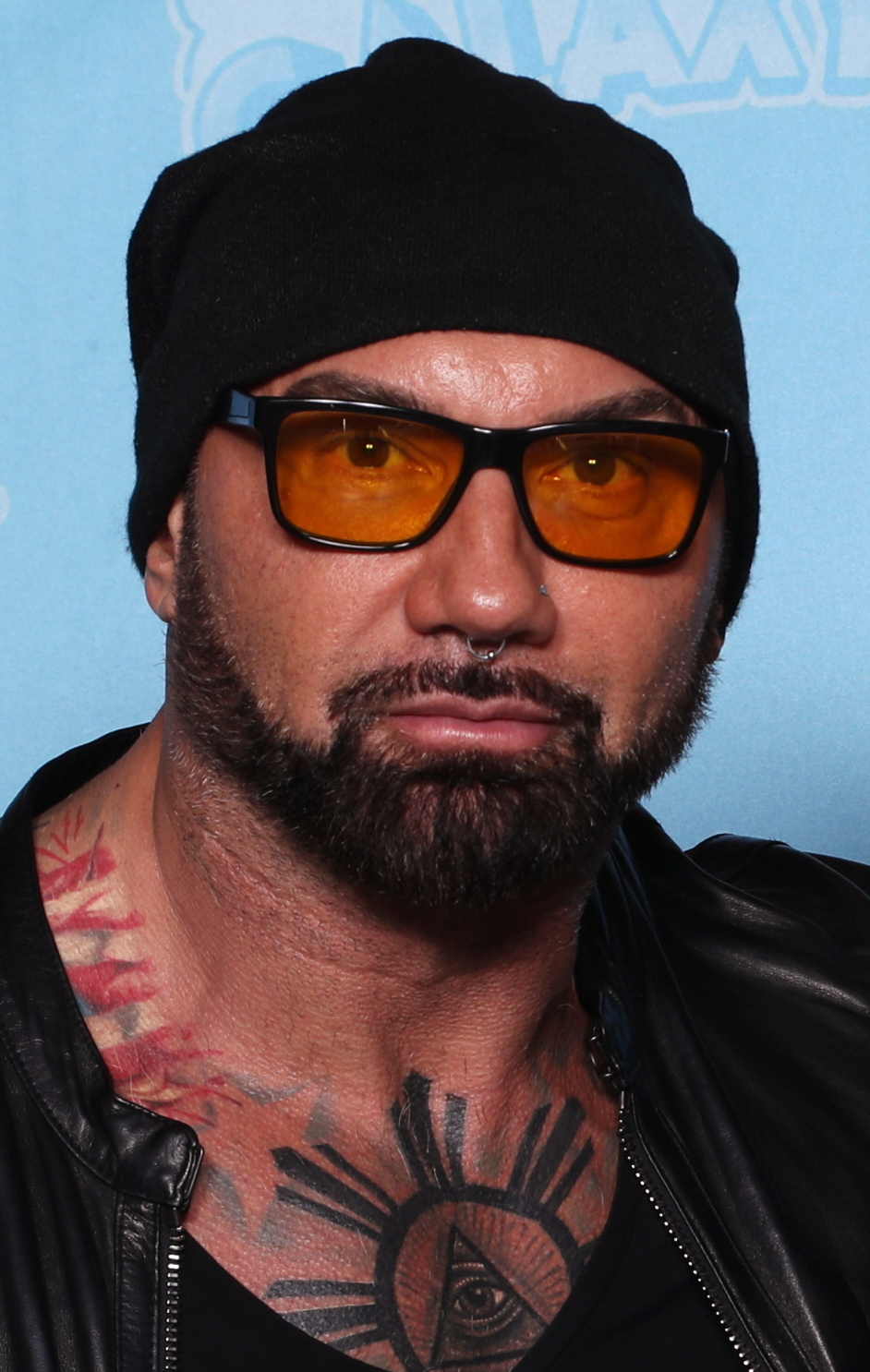
Dave Bautista

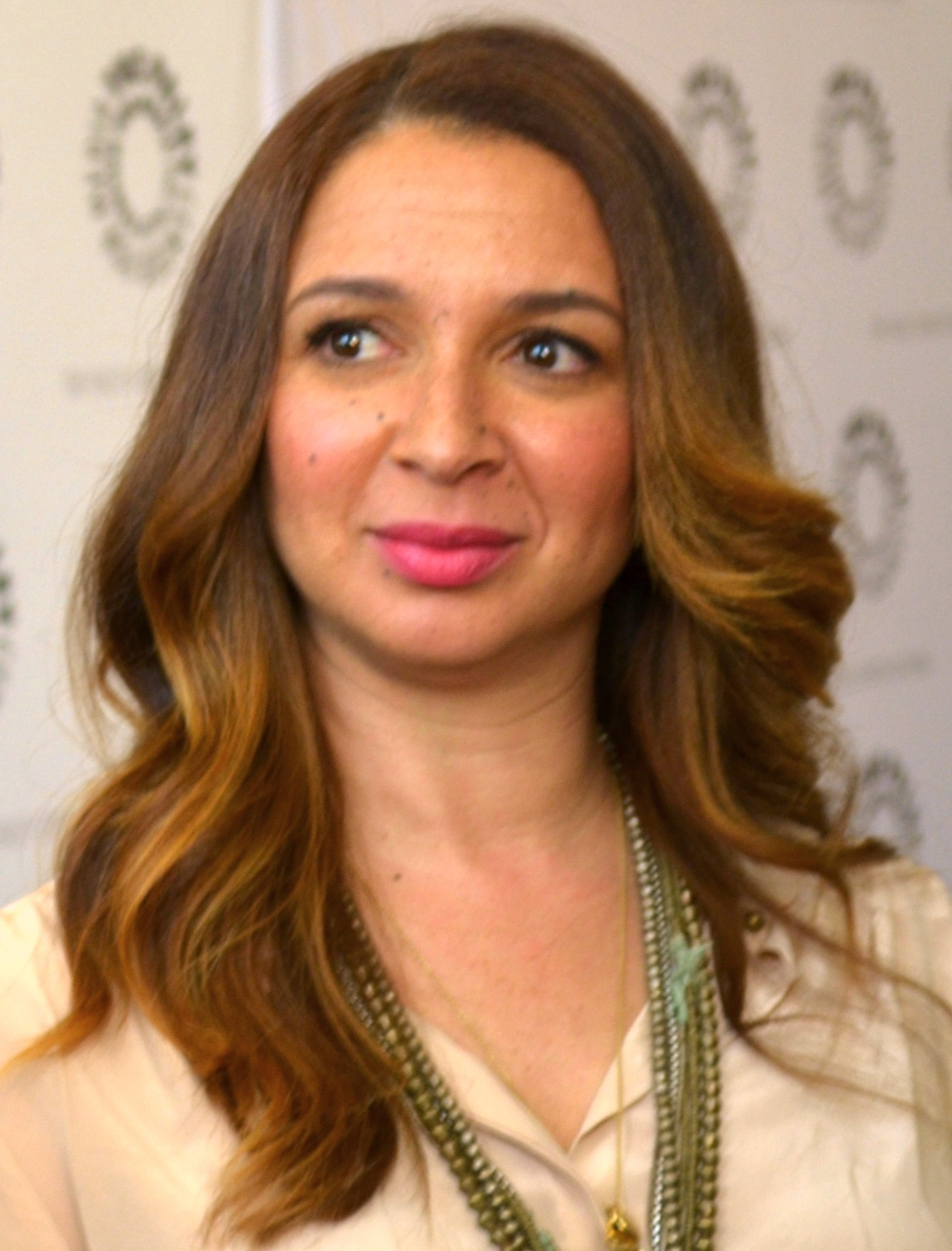
Maya Rudolph

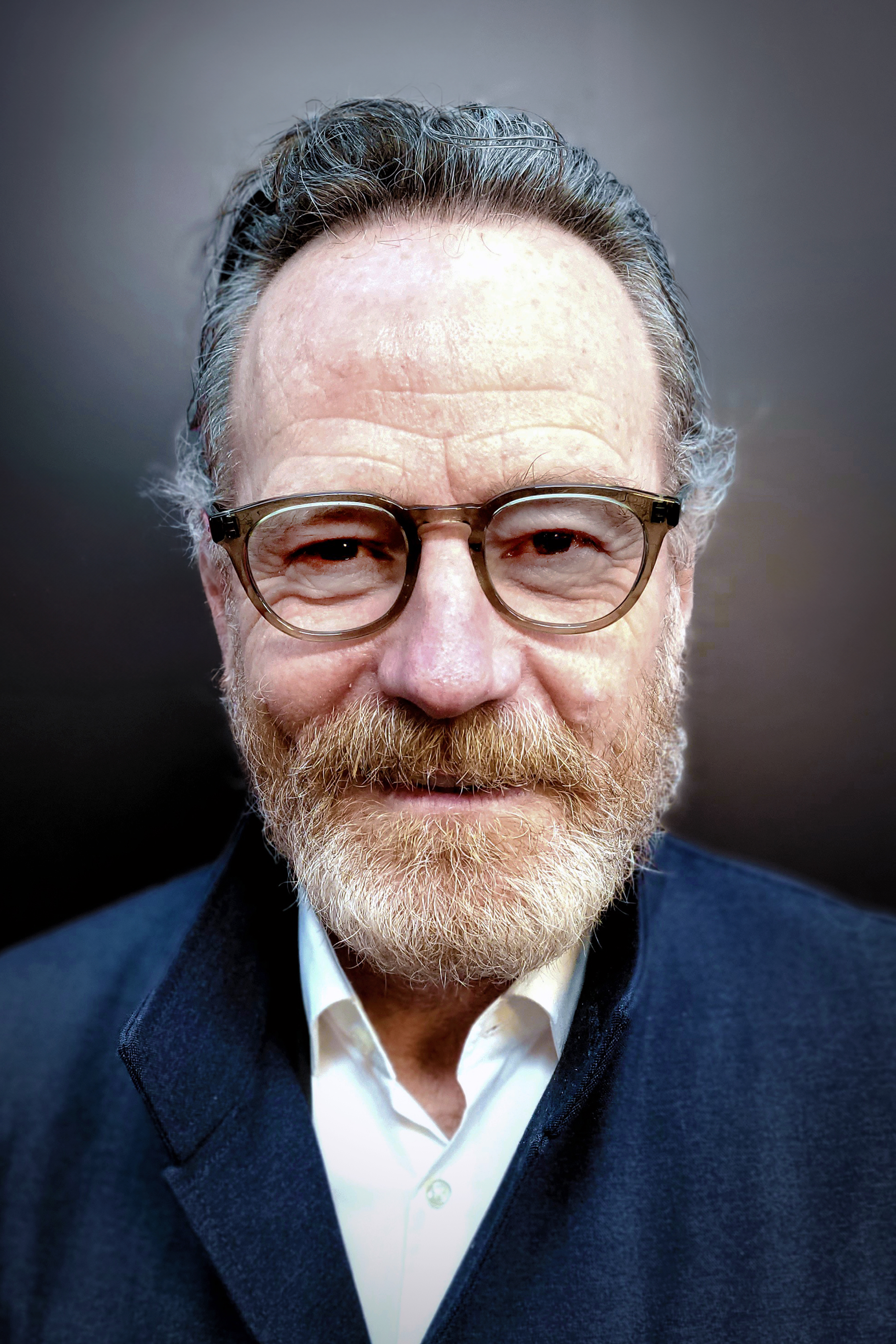
Bryan Cranston

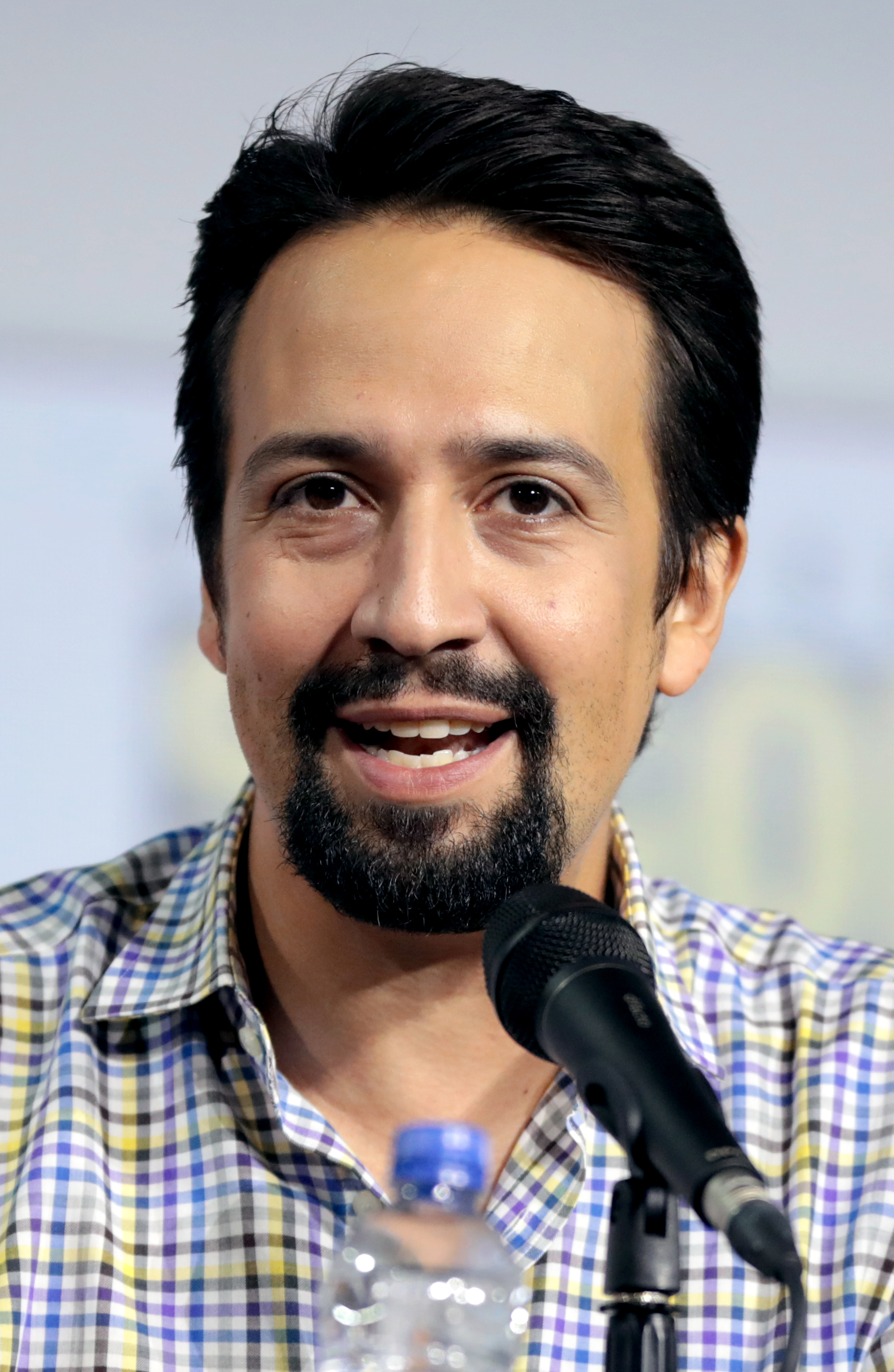
Lin-Manuel Miranda

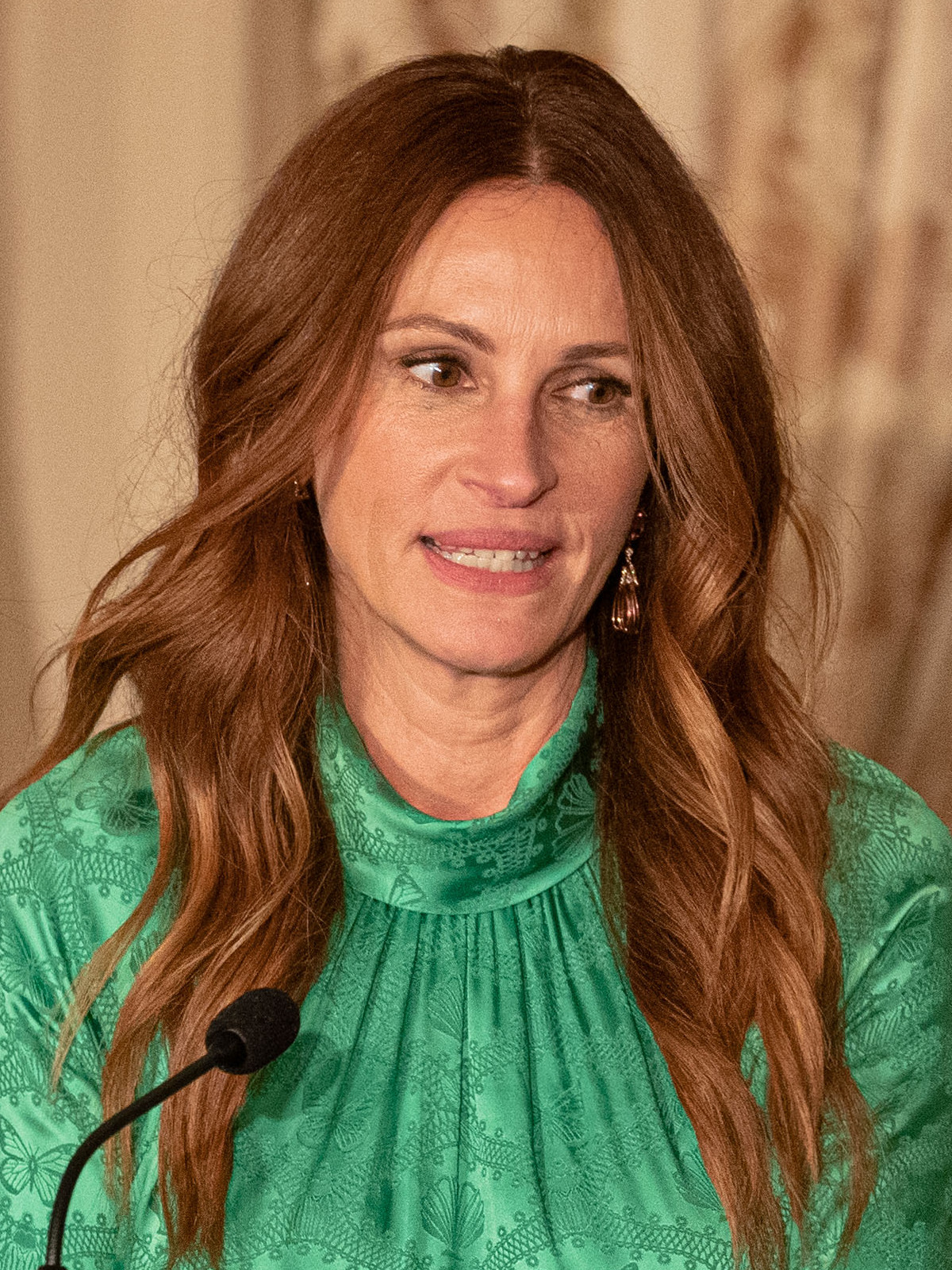
Julia Roberts

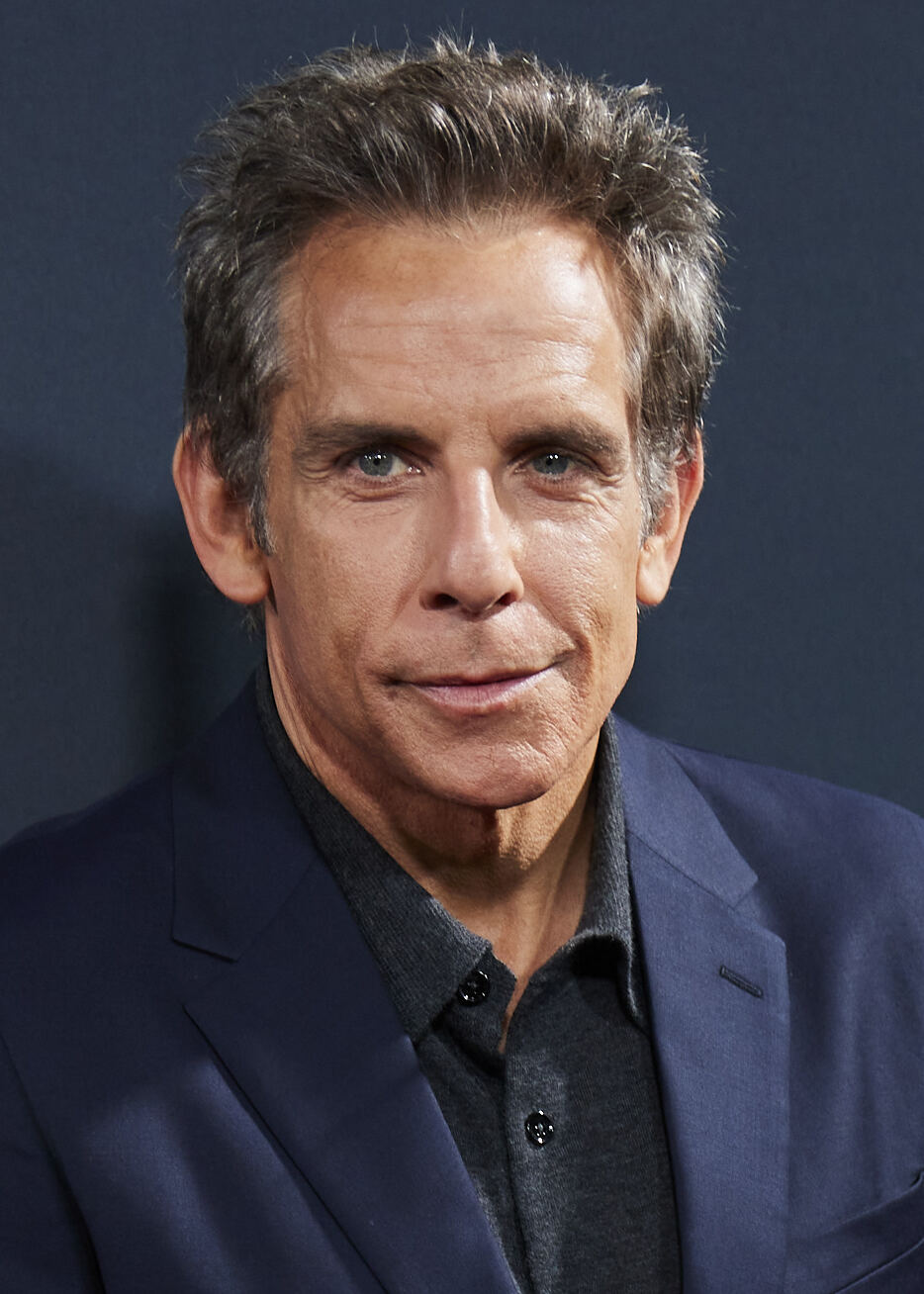
Ben Stiller

- Jensen Ackles
- Nick Adams
- Uzo Aduba
- Arianna Afsar
- Jessica Alba
- Jason Alexander
- Tabyana Ali
- Tatyana Ali
- Jelani Alladin
- Debbie Allen
- Laz Alonso
- Utkarsh Ambudkar
- Anthony Anderson
- Bradford Anderson
- Jennifer Aniston
- Jonathan Del Arco
- Iain Armitage
- Tom Arnold
- Nicholas L. Ashe
- Sean Astin
- Avantika
- Rakie Ayola
- Yetide Badaki
- Sala Baker
- Alec Baldwin
- Elizabeth Banks
- Christine Baranski
- Ike Barinholtz
- Todd Barry
- Jason Bateman
- Bryan Batt
- Dave Bautista
- Shoshana Bean
- Garcelle Beauvais
- Lake Bell
- Shari Belafonte
- Laura Benanti
- Julie Benko
- Paul Bettany
- Anjali Bhimani
- Esmé Bianco
- Alexandra Billings
- Sarayu Blue
- Matt Bomer
- Lorraine Bracco
- Eric Braeden
- Sufe Bradshaw
- Brenda Braxton
- Jeff Bridges
- Christie Brinkley
- Connie Britton
- Jayne Brook
- Mel Brooks
- Rachel Brosnahan
- Sterling K. Brown
- Yvette Nicole Brown
- Dan Bucatinsky
- Betty Buckley
- Laura Bell Bundy
- LeVar Burton
- Mica Burton
- Steve Buscemi
- Sophia Bush
- Jaime Camil
- Lynda Carter
- Vincent Caso
- Adam Chanler-Berat
- Rosalind Chao
- Osric Chau
- Don Cheadle
- Parvesh Cheena
- Kristin Chenoweth
- Ashlei Sharpe Chestnut
- Desmond Chiam
- Mary Chieffo
- Anna Chlumsky
- John Cho
- Victoria Clark
- John Cleese
- George Clooney
- Glenn Close
- Jennifer Cody
- Gary Cole
- Jenn Colella
- Lily Collins
- Misha Collins
- Liza Colón-Zayas
- Adam Conover
- Jennifer Coolidge
- Lilli Cooper
- Marianne Leone Cooper
- Lorna Courtney
- Laverne Cox
- Bryan Cranston
- Chace Crawford
- Gavin Creel (Deceased)
- Darren Criss
- Denise Crosby
- Wilson Cruz
- Jon Cryer
- Alan Cumming
- Ayesha Curry
- Valorie Curry
- Jane Curtin
- Jamie Lee Curtis
- Robin Curtis
- John Cusack
- Tim Daly
- Bertila Damas
- Matt Damon
- William Daniels
- Ted Danson
- Eileen Davidson
- Viola Davis
- Rosario Dawson
- Felicia Day
- Robert De Niro
- Elizabeth Dennehy
- Guillermo Díaz
- Leonardo DiCaprio
- Matt Dillon
- Colman Domingo
- Robert Downey Jr.
- Matt Doyle
- Fran Drescher
- David Duchovny
- Clea DuVall
- Michael Ealy
- Billy Eichner
- Jane Elliot
- Sam Elliott
- Raúl Esparza
- Eden Espinosa
- Chris Evans
- Morgan Fairchild
- Terry Farrell
- Jesse Tyler Ferguson
- Will Ferrell
- America Ferrera
- Sally Field
- Paul Fitzgerald
- Brandon Flynn
- Scott Foley
- Jane Fonda
- Harrison Ford
- Genie Francis
- Matt Friend
- Karen Fukuhara
- Josh Gad
- Megan Gallagher
- Jennifer Gambatese
- Jennifer Garner
- Ana Gasteyer
- Jason Winston George
- Kaia Gerber
- Richard Gere
- J. Harrison Ghee
- Paul Giamatti
- Jeff Goldblum
- Tony Goldwyn
- Nicholas Gonzalez
- Bonnie Gordon
- Joseph Gordon-Levitt
- Nancy Lee Grahn
- Max Greenfield
- Blake Cooper Griffin
- Kathryn Grody
- Danai Gurira
- Martha Hackett
- Kathryn Hahn
- Tony Hale
- Mark Hamill
- Jon Hamm
- Tom Hanks
- Van Hansis
- Mariska Hargitay
- Hill Harper
- Jackée Harry
- Anne Hathaway
- Ethan Hawke
- Rick Hearst
- Tim Heidecker
- Ed Helms
- Elizabeth Hendrickson
- Erika Henningsen
- Catherine Hicks
- Dulé Hill
- Ashley Hinshaw
- Tina Huang
- Vanessa Hudgens
- Finola Hughes
- Michelle Hurd
- James Monroe Iglehart
- Michael Imperioli
- Erika Ishii
- Aabria Iyengar
- Samuel L. Jackson
- Arielle Jacobs
- Poorna Jagannathan
- Nikki M. James
- Allison Janney
- Ken Jeong
- Maz Jobrani
- Scarlett Johansson
- Claudia Jordan
- Jeremy Jordan
- Ashley Judd
- Mindy Kaling
- Michael Keaton
- Andrew Keenan-Bolger
- Celia Keenan-Bolger
- Michael Kelly
- Keegan-Michael Key
- Brook Kerr
- Daniel Dae Kim
- Jeff Kober
- Boris Kodjoe
- David Koechner
- Liza Koshy
- Shin Koyamada
- Judy Kuhn
- LaChanze
- Jennifer Lawrence
- Raymond Lee
- John Leguizamo
- Thomas Lennon
- Telly Leung
- Dawnn Lewis
- Jenifer Lewis
- Casey Likes
- Matthew Lillard
- Lisa Locicero
- Eva Longoria
- Julia Louis-Dreyfus
- Katie Lowes
- Patti LuPone
- Natasha Lyonne
- Tzi Ma
- Seth MacFarlane
- Joshua Malina
- Kate Mansi
- Chase Masterson
- Isabelle McCalla
- Mary McCormack
- Audra McDonald
- Gates McFadden
- Joel McHale
- Leighton Meester
- Idina Menzel
- Andy Merrill
- Chris Messina
- Bette Midler
- Alyssa Milano
- Lin-Manuel Miranda
- Matthew Modine
- Janel Moloney
- Demi Moore
- Julianne Moore
- Rita Moreno
- Chloë Grace Moretz
- Erin Moriarty
- Kate Mulgrew
- Javier Muñoz
- Patti Murin
- Kathy Najimy
- Leonardo Nam
- Aparna Nancherla
- Niecy Nash
- Shakina Nayfack
- George Newbern
- Cynthia Nixon
- Annika Noelle
- Dean Norris
- Lupita Nyong'o
- Leslie Odom Jr.
- Nick Offerman
- Kelli O'Hara
- Edward James Olmos
- Rory O'Malley
- Tatum O'Neal
- Ed O'Neill
- Maulik Pancholy
- Chris Pang
- Ashley Park
- Linda Park
- Nicole Ari Parker
- Sarah Jessica Parker
- Ravel Patel
- Mandy Patinkin
- Lauren Patten
- Sarah Paulson
- Holly Robinson Peete
- Kal Penn
- Piper Perabo
- Rosie Perez
- Pauley Perrette
- Jeff Perry
- Tyler Perry
- Valarie Pettiford
- Busy Philipps
- Lou Diamond Phillips
- Robert Picardo
- Wendell Pierce
- Oliver Platt
- Ellen Pompeo
- Melissa Ponzio
- Jeremy Pope
- Billy Porter
- Jack Quaid
- Zachary Quinto
- Sheryl Lee Ralph
- Anthony Ramos
- Andrew Rannells
- Anthony Rapp
- Robert Redford
- Kate Reinders
- Alysia Reiner
- Sam Richardson
- Molly Ringwald
- Lisa Rinna
- Julia Roberts
- Craig Robinson
- Krysta Rodriguez
- Tracee Ellis Ross
- Yolonda Ross
- Portia de Rossi
- Emmy Rossum
- Daphne Rubin-Vega
- Maya Rudolph
- Mark Ruffalo
- Jeri Ryan
- George Salazar
- Stark Sands
- Ruben Santiago-Hudson
- Richard Schiff
- Scott Turner Schofield
- Adam Scott
- Michael James Scott
- Reid Scott
- Christopher Sean
- Teddy Sears
- Kyra Sedgwick
- Martin Sheen
- Tiffany Shepis
- Sheetal Sheth
- Reshma Shetty
- Timothy Simons
- Tiya Sircar
- Tom Skerritt
- Antonique Smith
- Brian Michael Smith
- Cornelius Smith Jr.
- Rena Sofer
- Octavia Spencer
- John Stamos
- Kristen Stewart
- Ben Stiller
- Sharon Stone
- Meryl Streep
- Sarah Sutherland
- Kitty Swink
- Raven-Symoné
- George Takei
- Amber Tamblyn
- Larenz Tate
- Shaina Taub
- Renée Taylor
- Bex Taylor-Klaus
- Damian Terriquez
- Jennifer Laura Thompson
- Lea Thompson
- Bella Thorne
- Uma Thurman
- Marisa Tomei
- Tamlyn Tomita
- Lily Tomlin
- Gina Torres
- Lorraine Toussaint
- Russell Tovey
- Tony Tripoli
- Tanya Trotter
- John Turturro
- Aisha Tyler
- Dick Van Dyke
- Nia Vardalos
- Nana Visitor
- Kristina Wagner
- Kate Walsh
- Matt Walsh
- Lisa Ann Walter
- Adrienne Warren
- Kerry Washington
- Sam Waterston
- Vernee Watson-Johnson
- Sigourney Weaver
- Denise Welch
- Bradley Whitford
- Rita Wilson
- Chris Witaske
- Reese Witherspoon
- Deborah Ann Woll
- BD Wong
- Alfre Woodard
- Jeffrey Wright
- Laura Wright
- Hudson Yang
- Bellamy Young
- Dominic Zamprogna

== Architects, painters, photographers, and sculptors ==
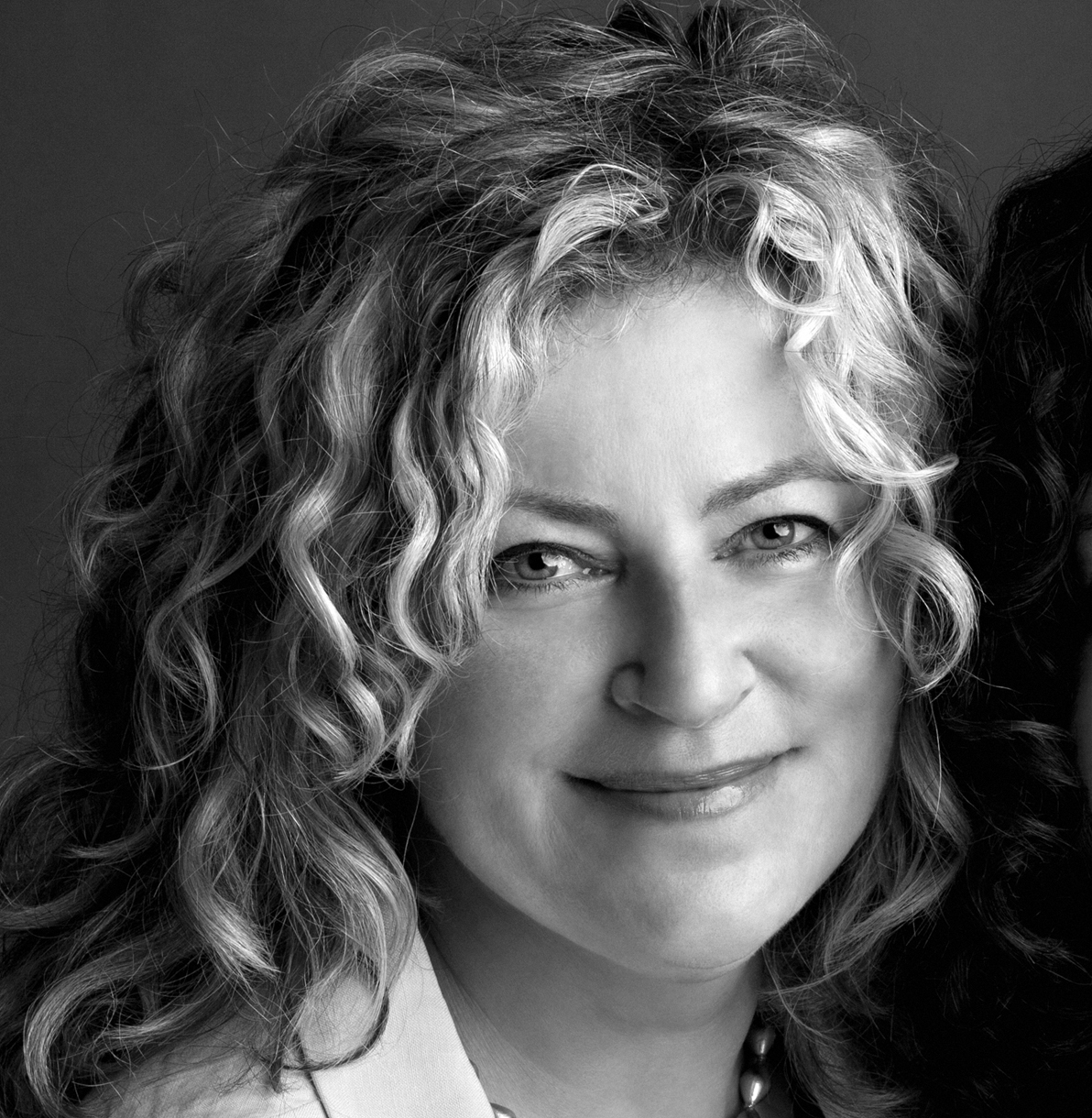
Patricia Cronin

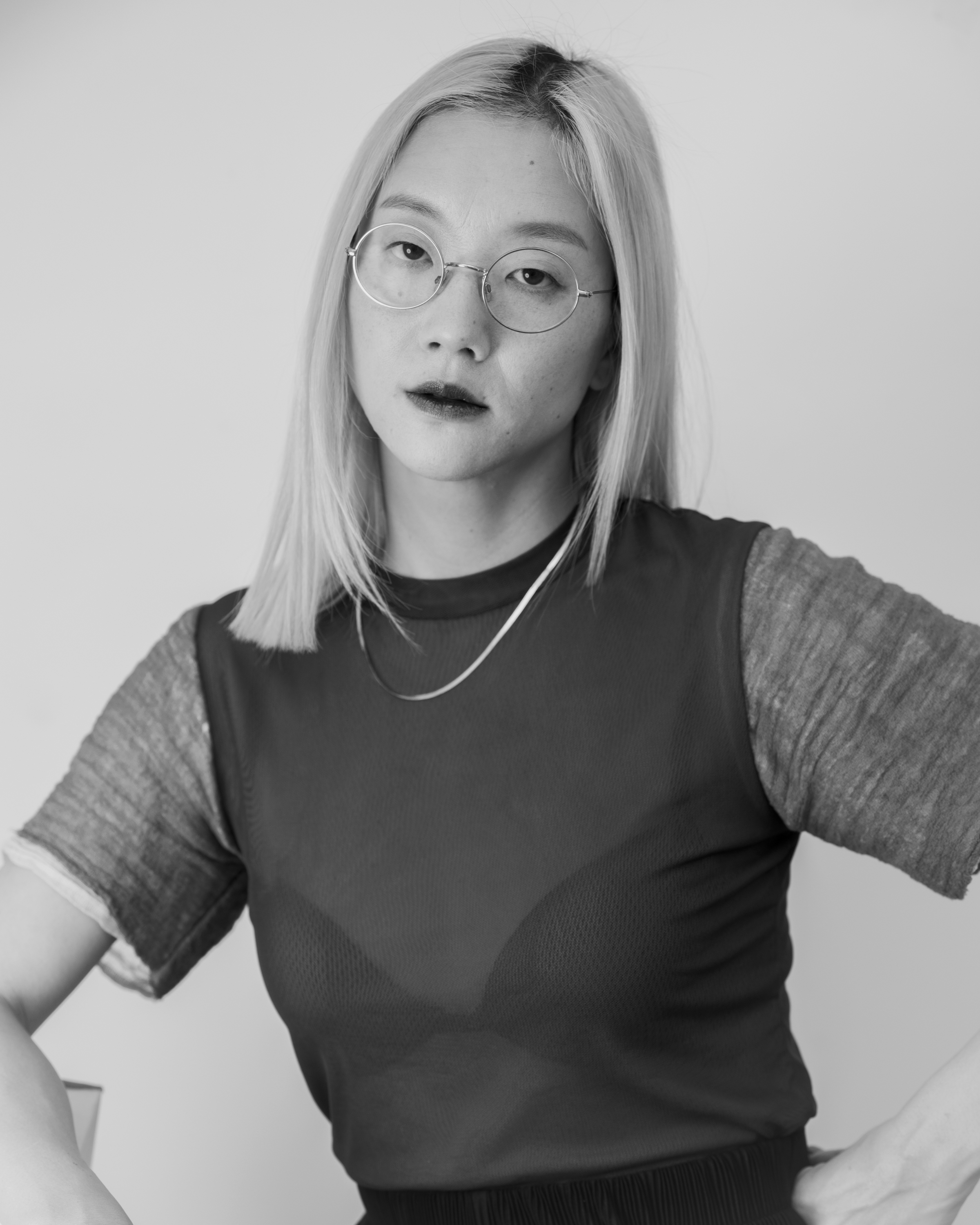
Christine Sun Kim

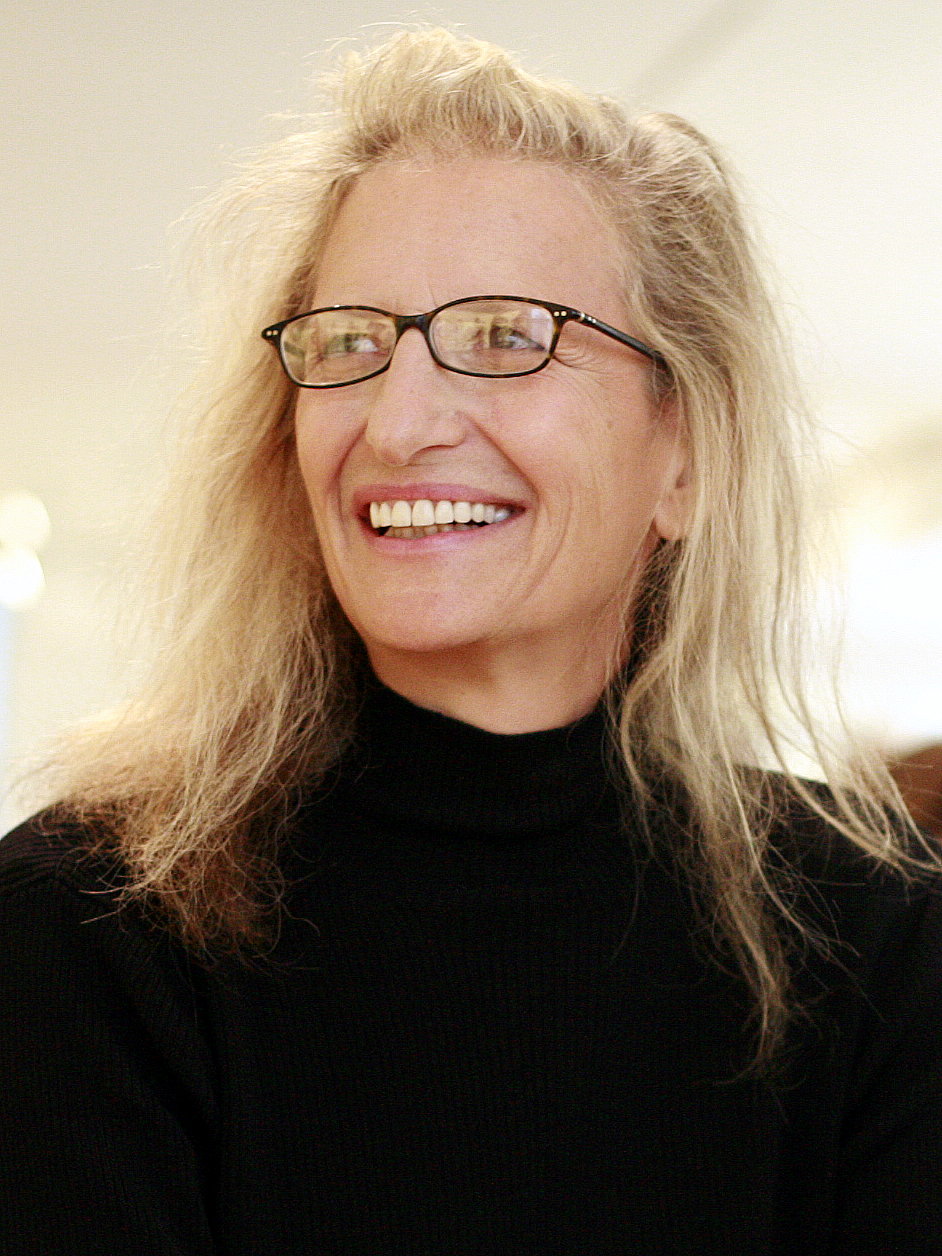
Annie Leibovitz

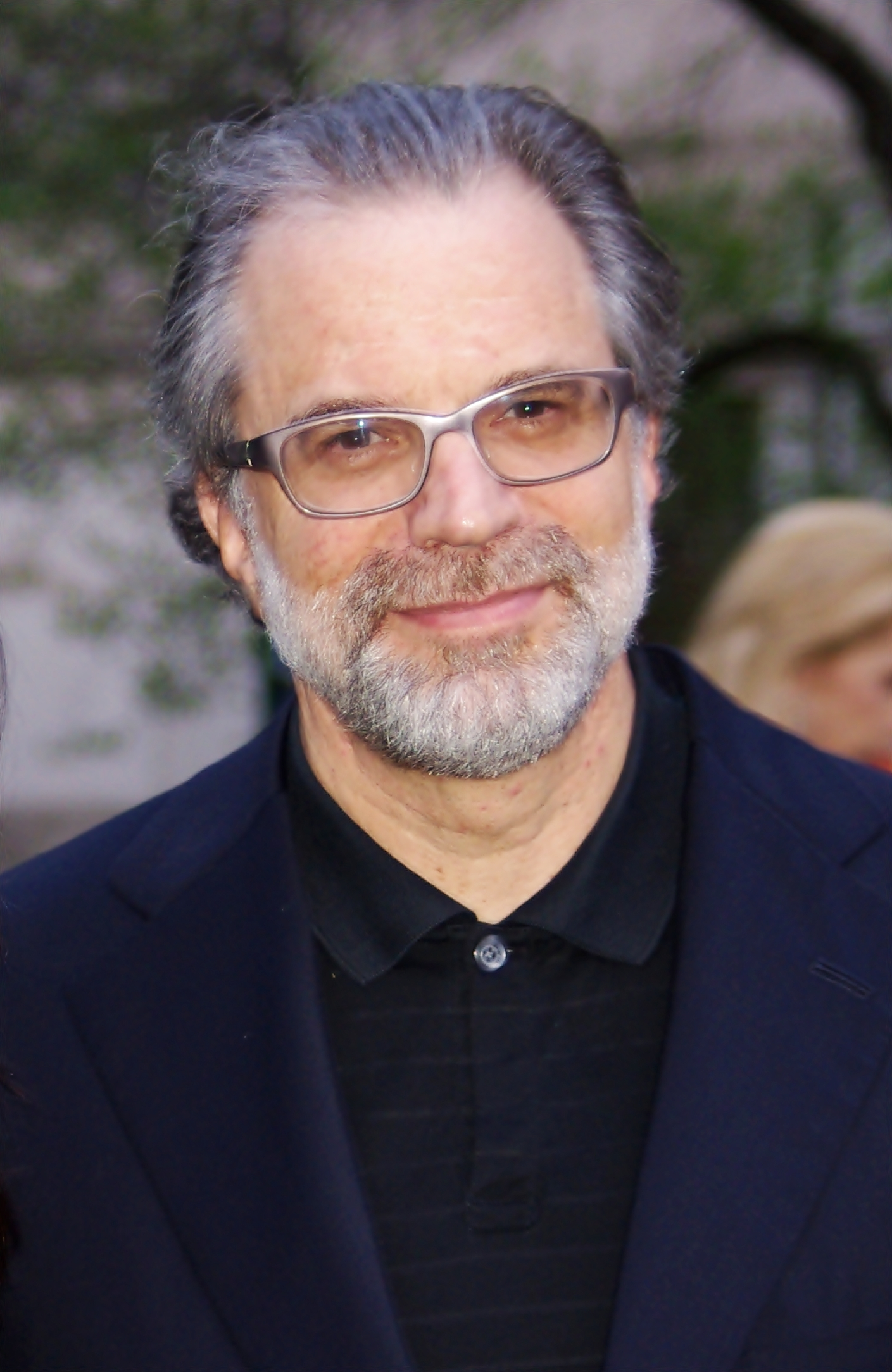
Clifford Ross

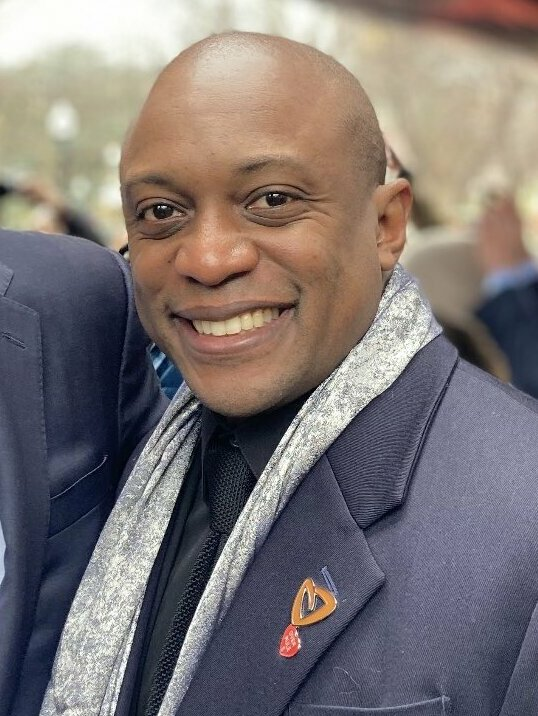
Hank Willis Thomas

- Lita Albuquerque
- David Allee
- Kii Arens
- Rushern Baker IV
- Michael Ballou
- Andrea Belag
- Larry Bell
- Billy Al Bengston's estate
- Ellen Berkenblit
- Katherine Bernhardt
- Ashwini Bhat
- Lauren Bon
- Suzanne Deal Booth
- Andrea Bowers
- Tom Burckhardt
- Chris Burden's estate
- Jordan Casteel
- Nick Cave
- Vija Celmins
- Judy Chicago
- Francesco Clemente
- George Condo
- Patricia Cronin
- N. Dash
- Amanda de Cadenet
- Leonardo Drew
- Carroll Dunham
- William Eggleston
- Shepard Fairey
- Tony Feher's estate
- Carole Feuerman
- Eric Fischl
- Beverly Fishman
- Walton Ford
- Natalie Frank
- Suzan Frecon
- Gerard & Kelly
- Lyle Ashton Harris
- Carmen Herrera's estate
- Sheila Hicks
- Jenny Holzer
- Lonnie Holley
- Jonathan Horowitz
- David Humphrey
- Bill Jacobson
- Jasper Johns
- Rashid Johnson
- Joan Jonas
- Dennis Kardon
- Deborah Kass
- Alex Katz
- Ellsworth Kelly's estate
- Jon Kessler
- Toba Khedoori
- Byron Kim
- Christine Sun Kim
- Jeff Koons
- Louise Lawler
- An-My Lê
- Annie Leibovitz
- Simone Leigh
- Isa Leshko
- Glenn Ligon
- Maya Lin
- Kalup Linzy
- Robert Longo
- Nate Lowman
- Maripol
- Suchitra Mattai
- Marilyn Minter
- Richard Misrach
- Donald Moffett
- Ivan Morley
- Christopher Morris
- Rebecca Morris
- Matt Mullican
- Vik Muniz
- Wangechi Mutu
- Alice Neel's estate
- Kadir Nelson
- Ruby Neri
- Angel Otero
- José Parlá
- Howardena Pindell
- Michele Pred
- Kenneth Price's estate
- Richard Prince
- Lucas Reiner
- Deborah Roberts
- Walter Robinson
- Alexis Rockman
- James Rosenquist's estate
- Clifford Ross
- Nancy Rubins
- Edward Ruscha
- Betye Saar
- Analia Saban
- Steve Sack
- Matt Saunders
- Julian Schnabel
- Richard Serra's estate
- Joel Shapiro
- Arlene Shechet
- Kate Shepherd
- Amy Sherald
- Cindy Sherman
- Amy Sillman
- Jaune Quick-to-See Smith
- Shinique Smith
- Pat Steir
- Hank Willis Thomas
- Rirkrit Tiravanija
- Fred Tomaselli
- Mark Tribe
- Boaz Vaadia's estate
- Kara Walker
- Kay WalkingStick
- Carrie Mae Weems
- James Welling
- Yvonne Wells
- Stephen Westfall
- Summer Wheat
- Christopher Williams
- Fred Wilson
- Christopher Wool
- Rob Wynne
- Lisa Yuskavage

== Chefs and restaurateurs ==
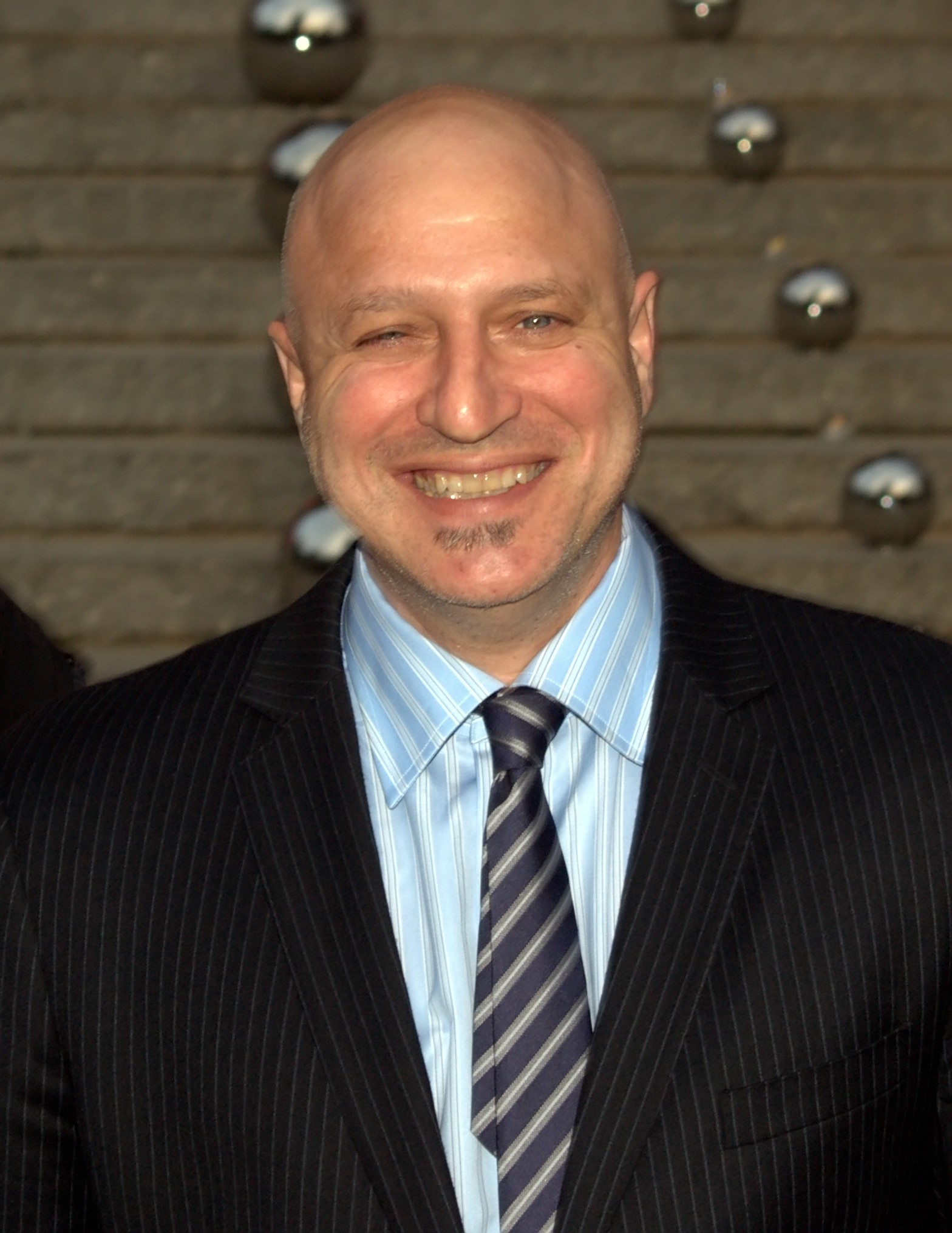
Tom Colicchio

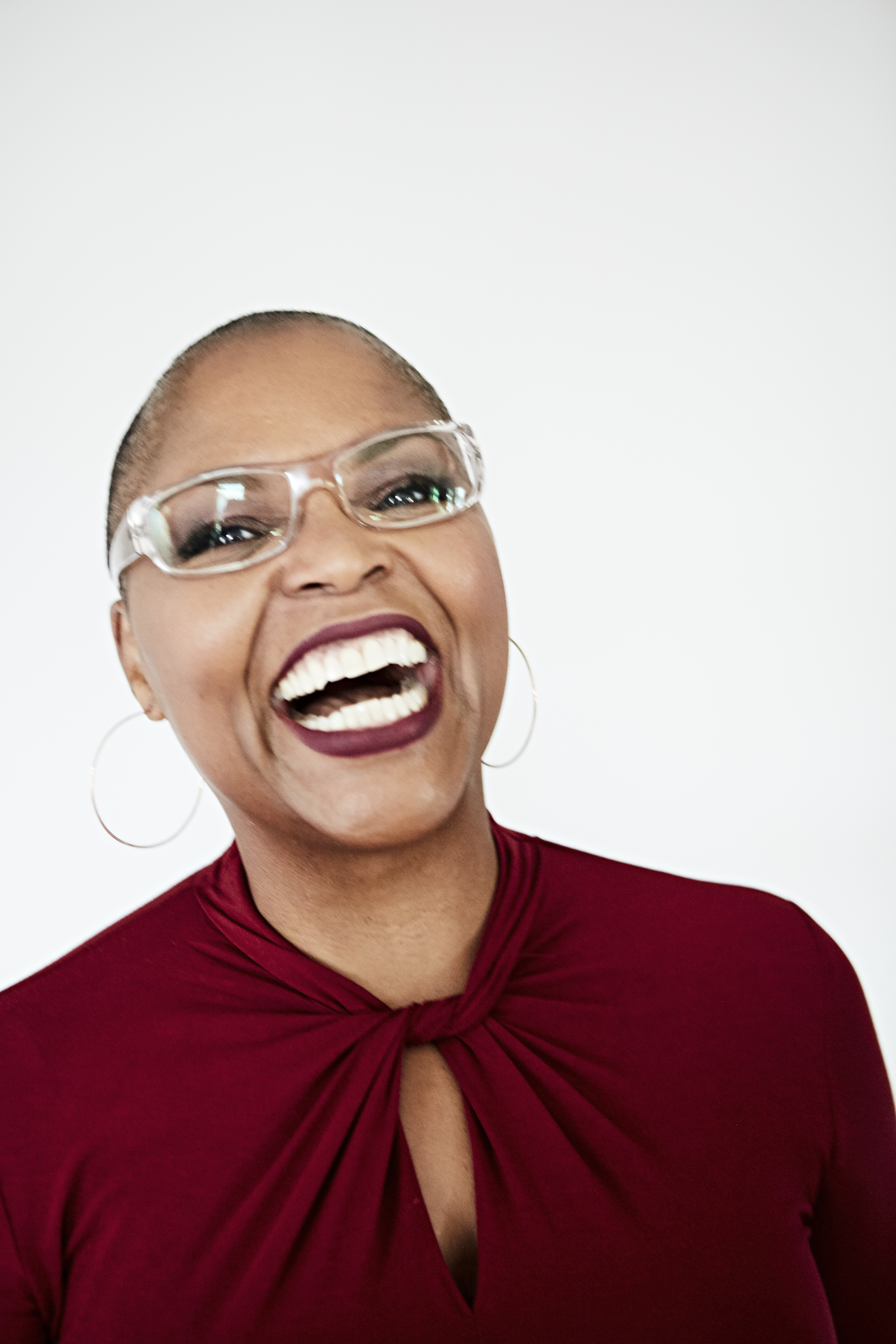
Tanya Holland

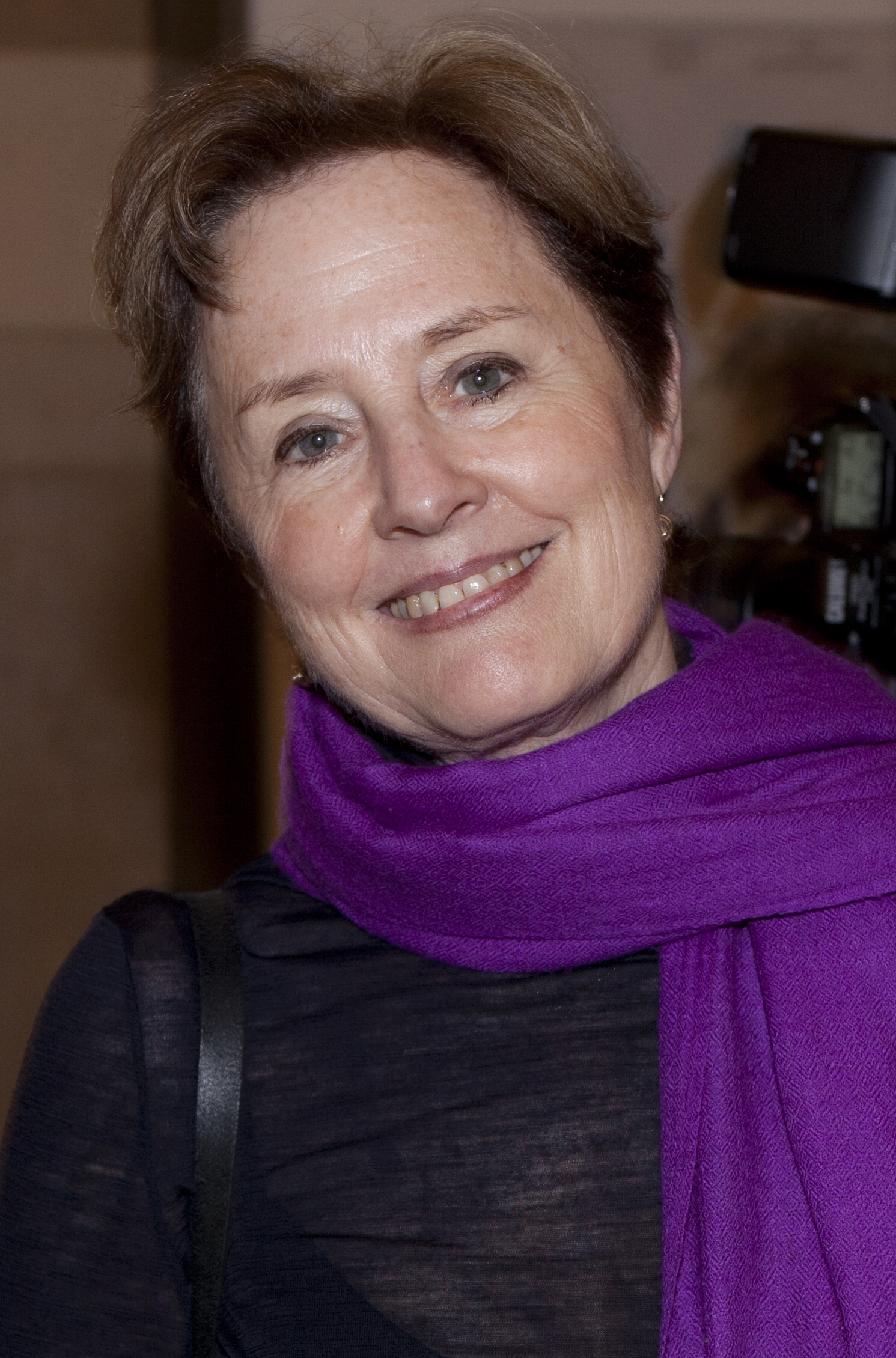
Alice Waters

- Jody Adams
- Sunny Anderson
- José Andrés
- Nyesha Arrington
- Molly Baz
- Chris Bianco
- April Bloomfield
- Melvin Jerome Brown
- Gabriela Cámara
- Michael Cimarusti
- Pinky Cole
- Tom Colicchio
- Cat Cora
- Tiffany Derry
- Tiffani Faison
- Elizabeth Falkner
- Susan Feniger
- Suzanne Goin
- Joyce Goldstein
- Carla Hall
- Rock Harper
- Tanya Holland
- Traci Des Jardins
- JJ Johnson
- Kristen Kish
- Giada De Laurentiis
- Bricia Lopez
- Danny Meyer
- Mary Sue Milliken
- Niki Nakayama
- Nancy Oakes
- Stuart O'Keeffe
- Ruth Reichl
- Marcus Samuelsson
- Sean Sherman
- Nancy Silverton
- Gail Simmons
- Art Smith
- Pierre Thiam
- Alice Waters
- Jonathan Waxman
- Brooke Williamson
- Martin Yan
- Sherry Yard
- Zac Young

== Comedians ==
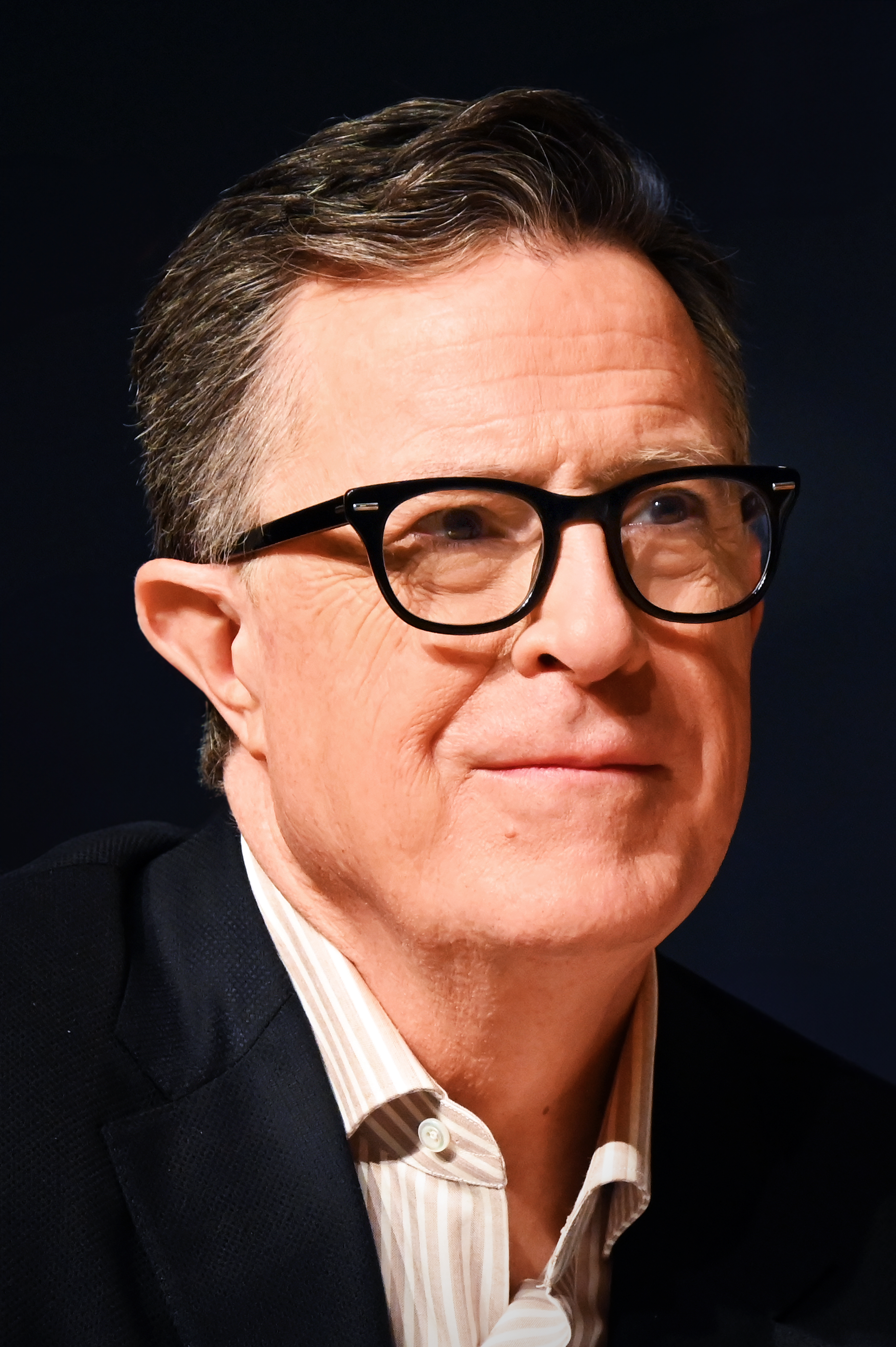
Stephen Colbert

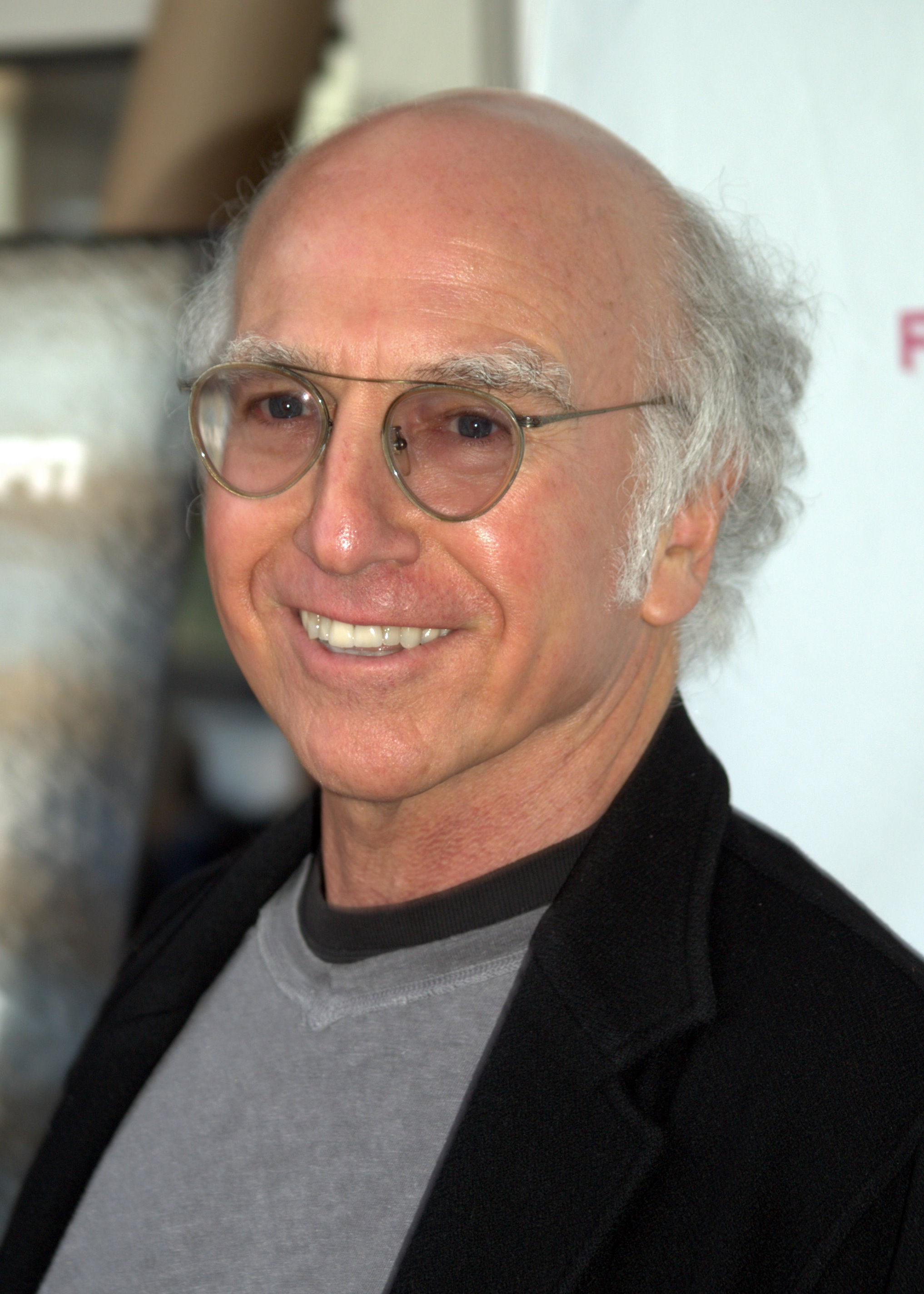
Larry David

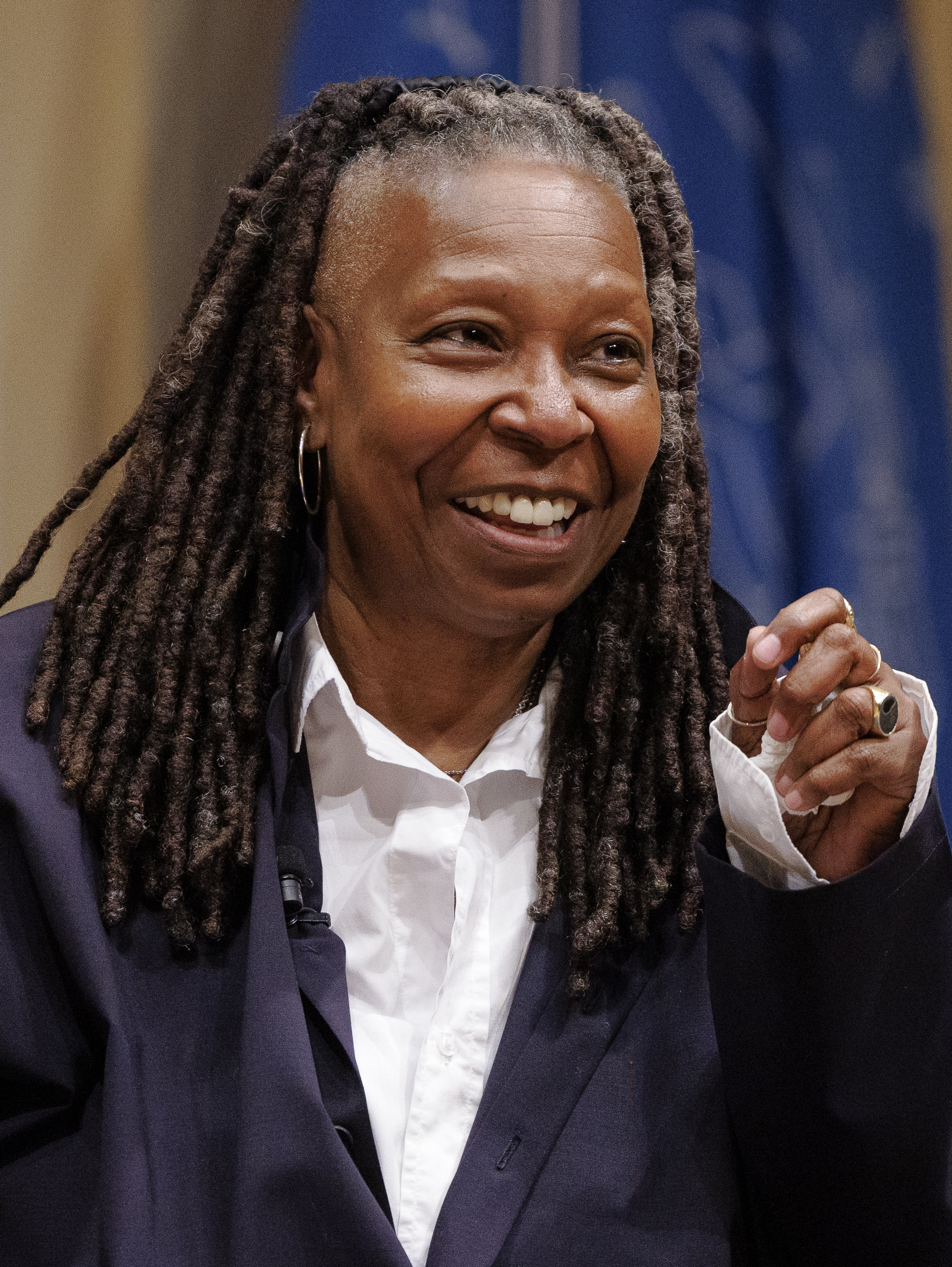
Whoopi Goldberg

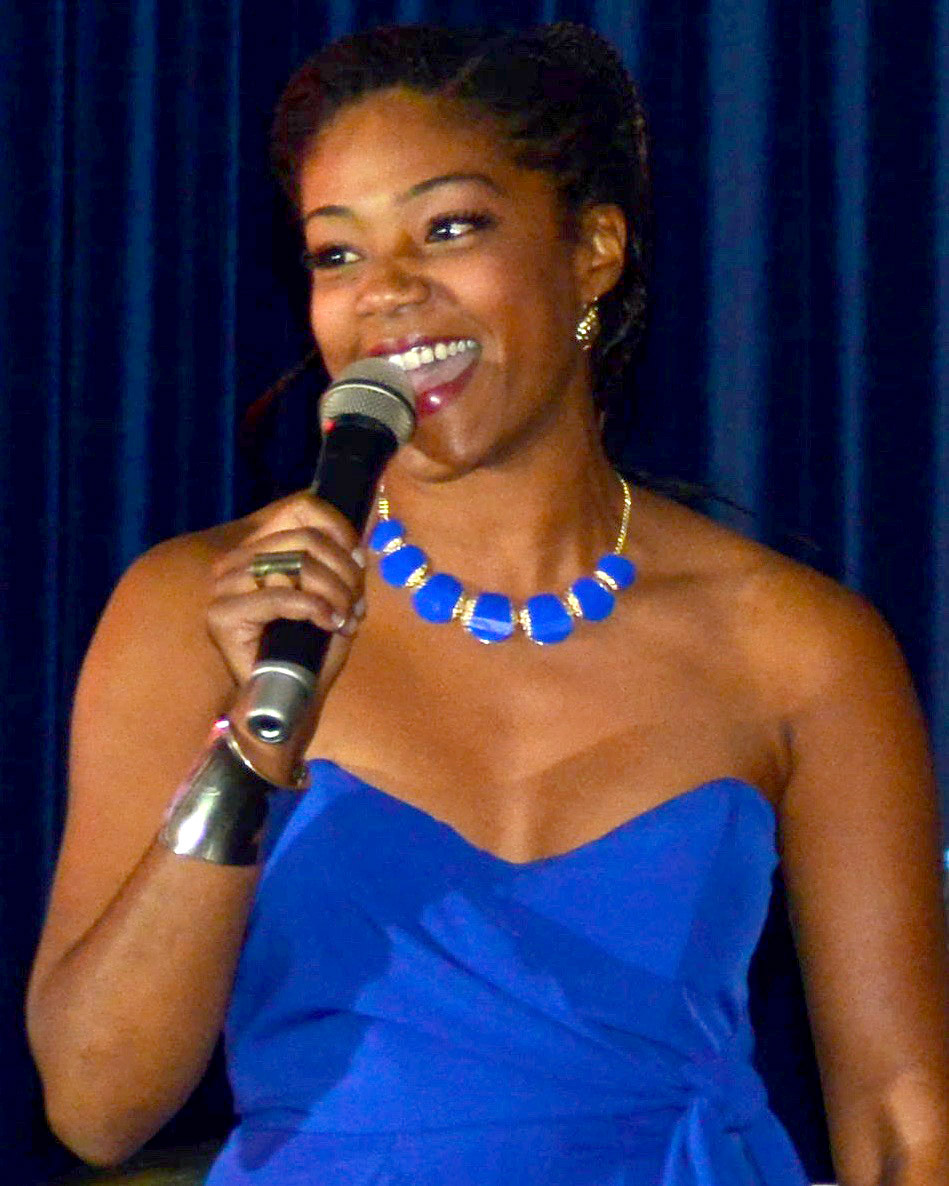
Tiffany Haddish

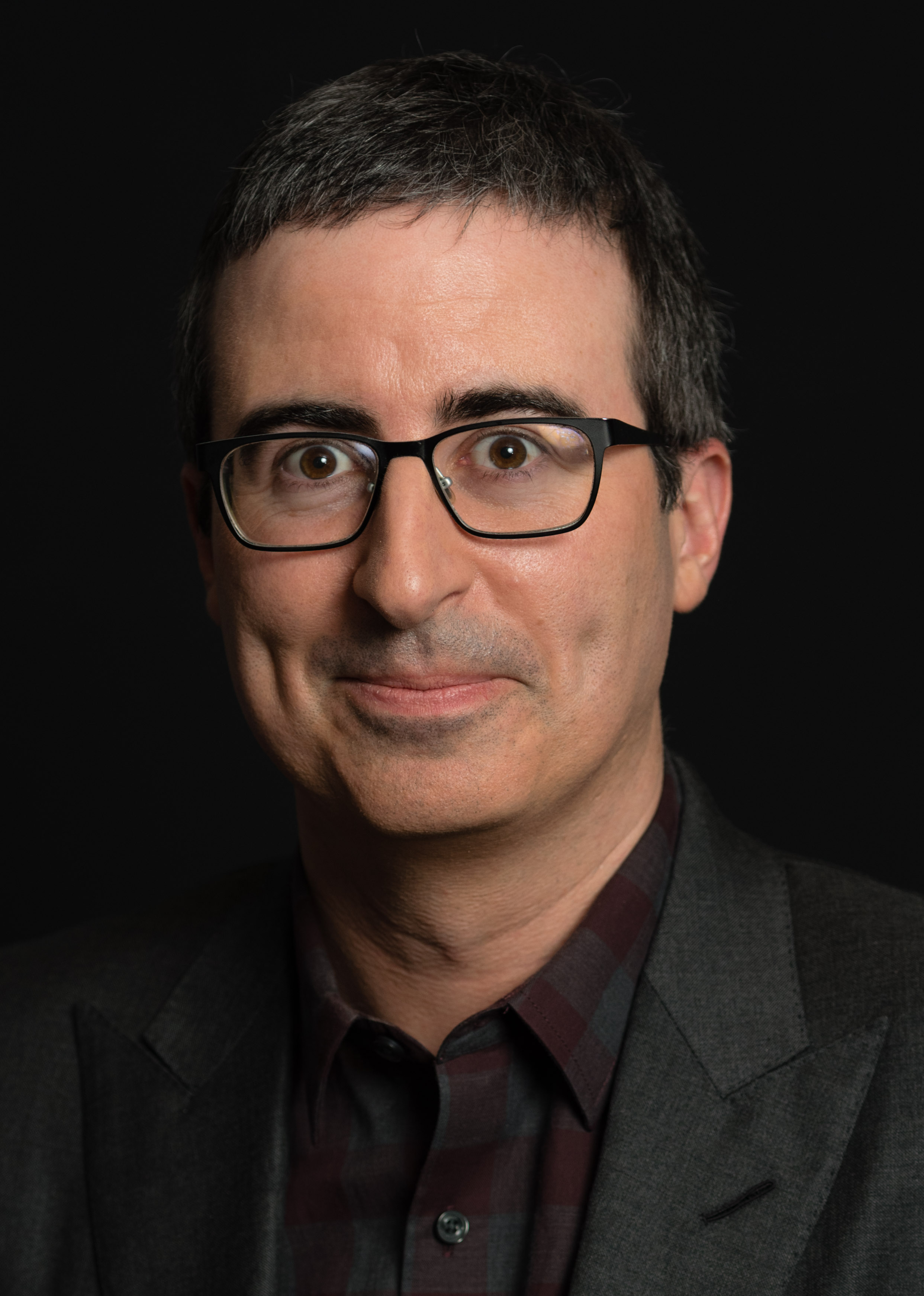
John Oliver

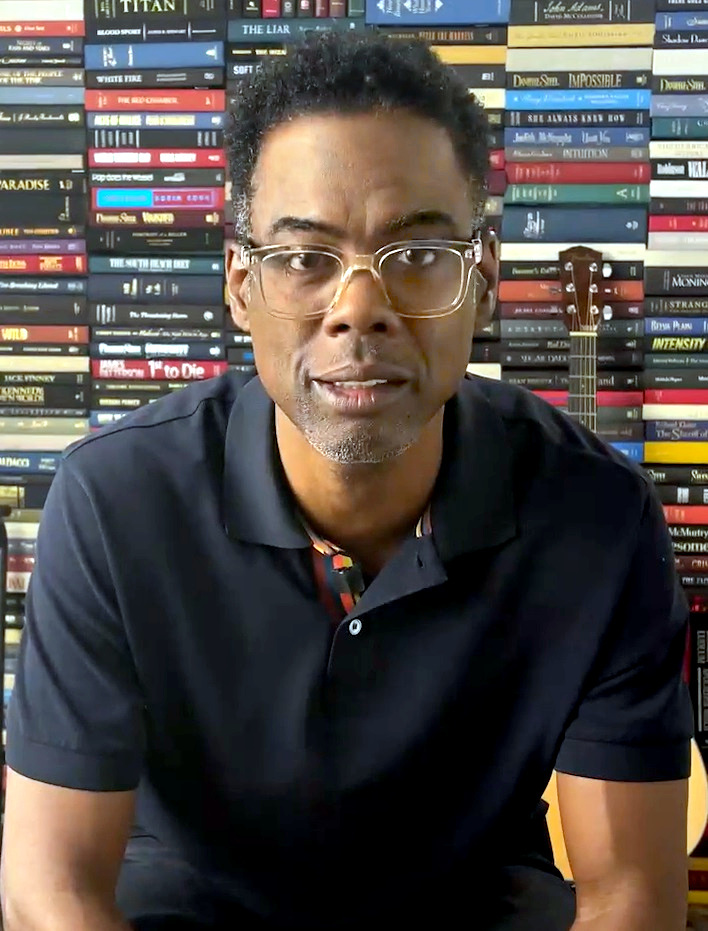
Chris Rock

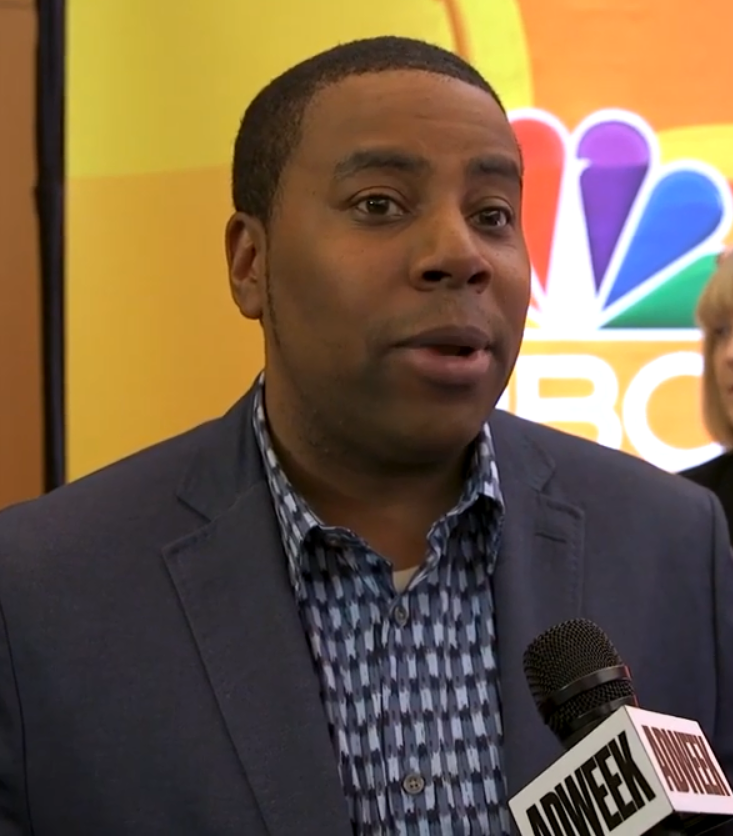
Kenan Thompson

- Kalen Allen
- Samantha Bee
- Joy Behar
- Sandra Bernhard
- Alonzo Bodden
- Michelle Buteau
- Drew Carey (Libertarian)
- Margaret Cho
- Stephen Colbert
- Trae Crowder
- Larry David
- Ellen DeGeneres
- Nik Dodani
- Alex Edelman
- Ophira Eisenberg
- Cedric the Entertainer
- Susie Essman
- Negin Farsad
- Christian Finnegan
- John Fugelsang
- Janeane Garofalo
- Illana Glazer
- Judy Gold
- Dana Goldberg
- Whoopi Goldberg
- Harrison Greenbaum
- Kathy Griffin
- Gary Gulman
- Tiffany Haddish
- Dave Hill
- D. L. Hughley
- Laurie Kilmartin
- George Lopez
- Al Madrigal
- Bill Maher
- Marc Maron
- Paul Mecurio
- Kumail Nanjiani
- Rex Navarrete
- Kevin Nealon
- John Oliver
- Patton Oswalt
- Rosie O'Donnell
- Paula Poundstone
- Brian Posehn
- Retta
- Phoebe Robinson
- Chris Rock
- Paul Scheer
- Jana Schmieding
- Amy Schumer
- Cecily Strong
- Wanda Sykes
- Robin Thede
- Kenan Thompson
- Baratunde Thurston
- Jimmy Tingle
- Taylor Tomlinson
- George Wallace
- Lisa Ann Walter
- Kate Willett
- Roy Wood Jr.

== Dancers and choreographers ==
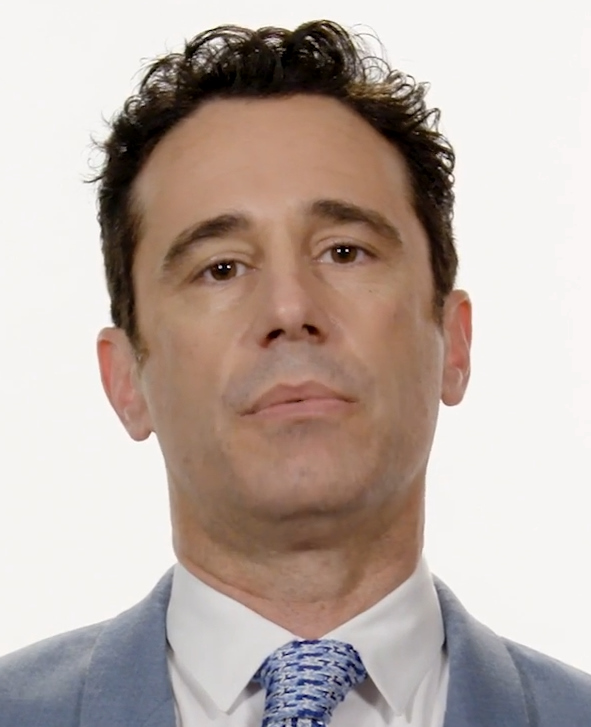
Christopher Gattelli

- Andy Blankenbuehler
- Brian Friedman
- Christopher Gattelli
- Donna King
- Desmond Richardson

== Designers ==
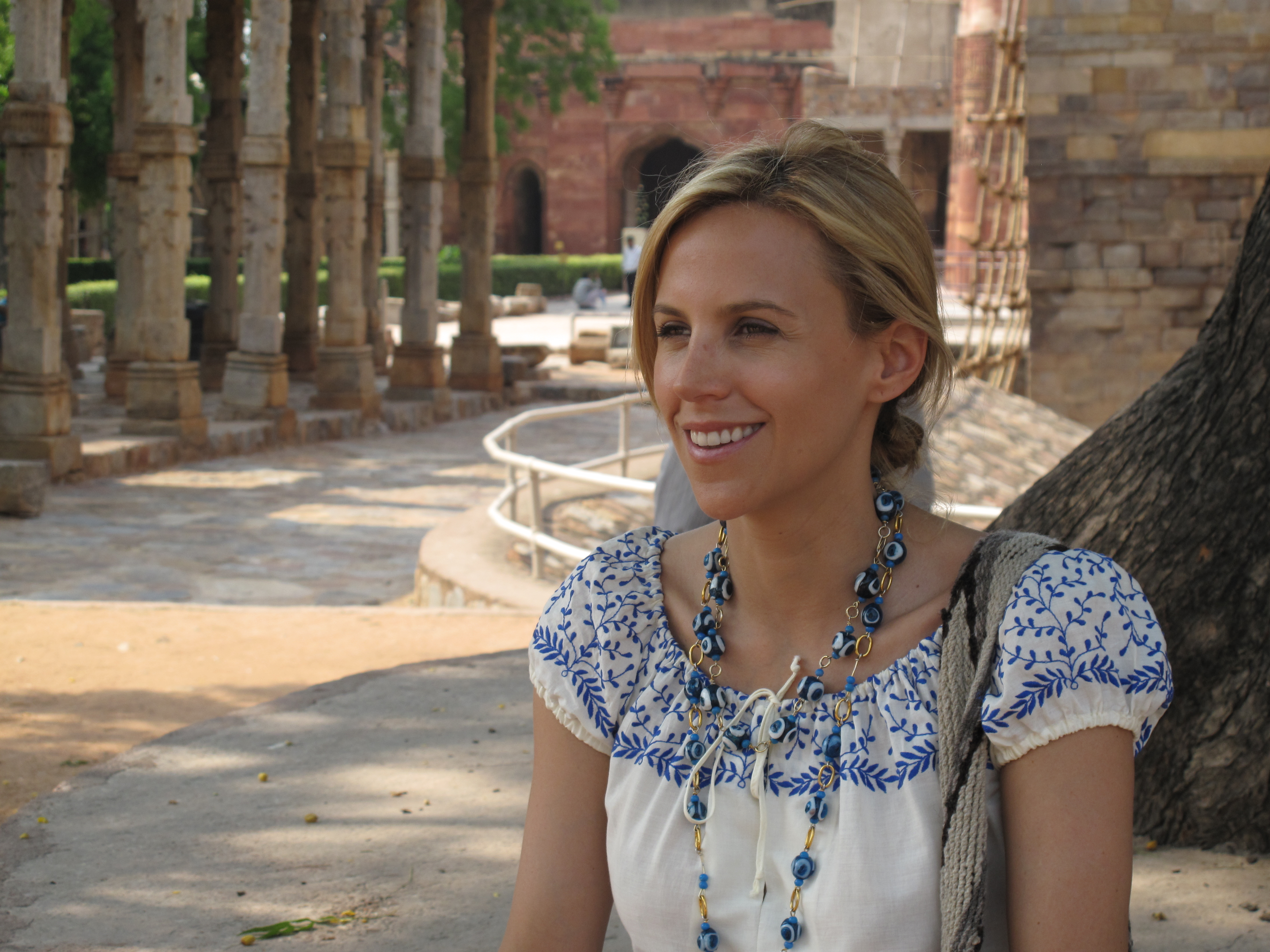
Tory Burch

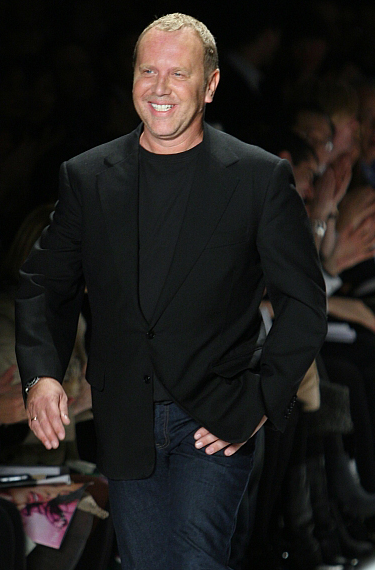
Michael Kors

- Joseph Altuzarra
- Bobby Berk
- Thom Browne
- Tory Burch
- Willy Chavarria
- Prabal Gurung
- Gabriela Hearst
- Sergio Hudson
- Jade Jagger
- Aurora James
- Ulla Johnson
- Isis King
- Michael Kors
- Phillip Lim
- Stacy London
- Jenna Lyons
- LaQuan Smith
- Michael S. Smith
- Vera Wang
- Joe Zee

== Filmmakers, screenwriters, directors, and producers ==
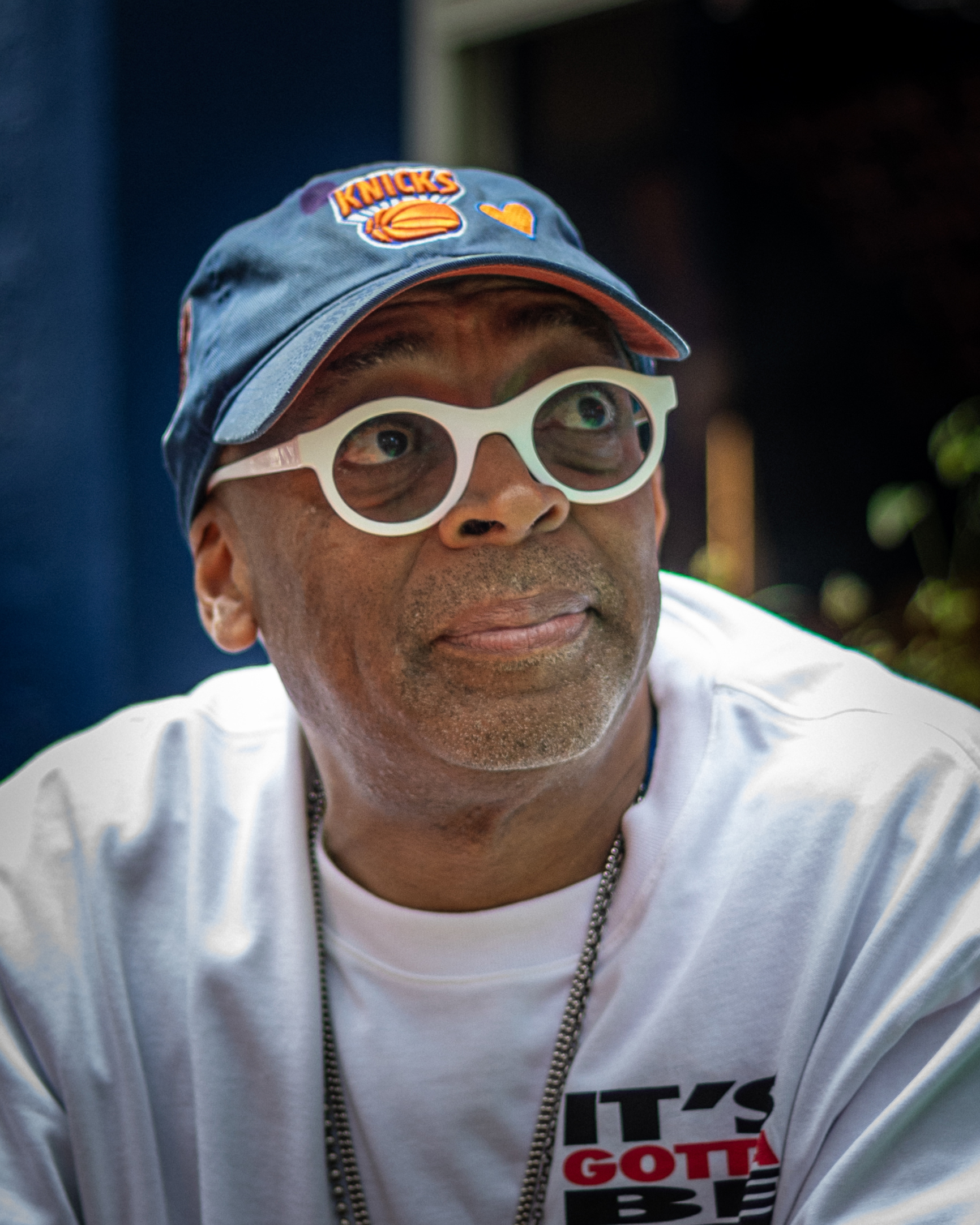
Spike Lee

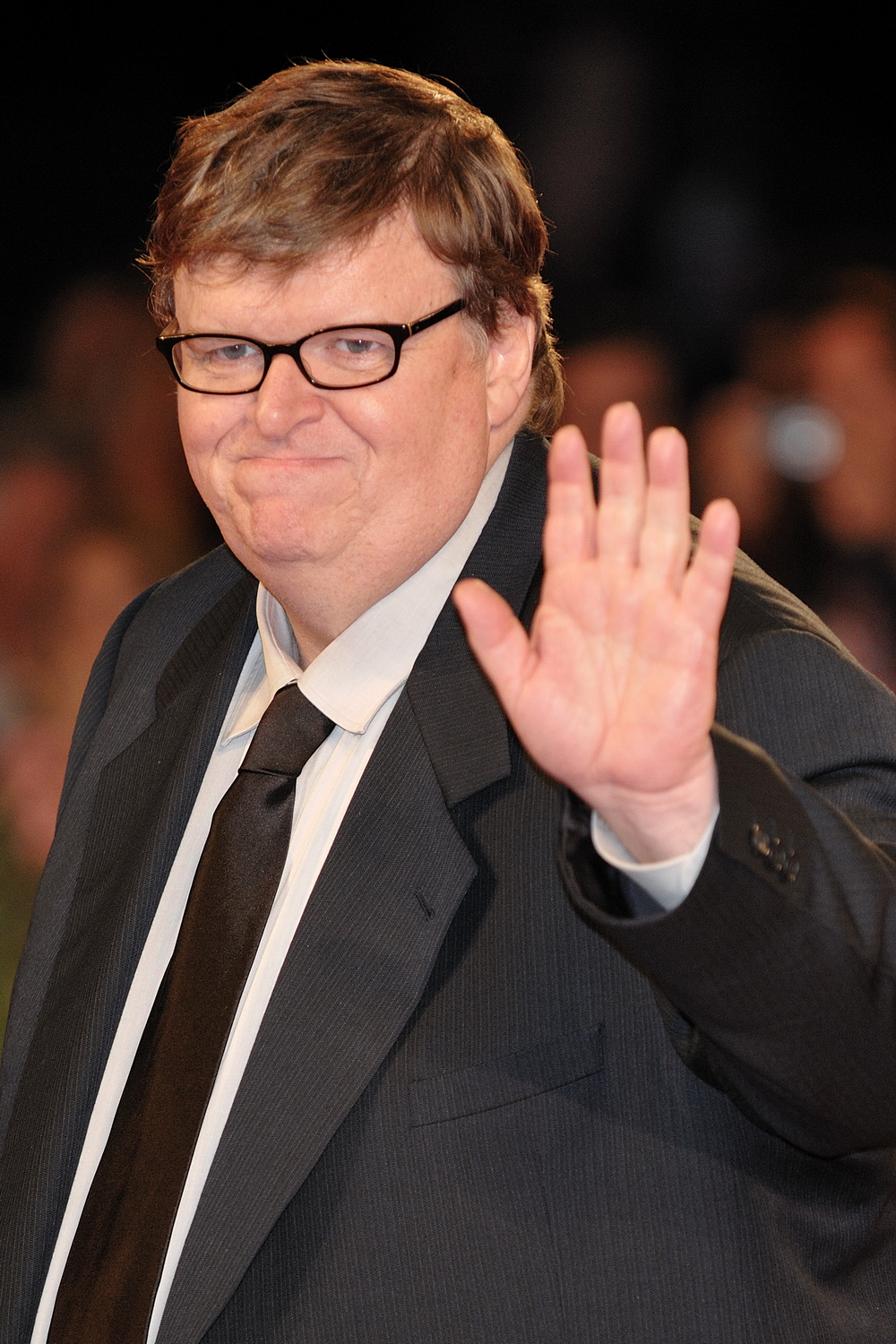
Michael Moore

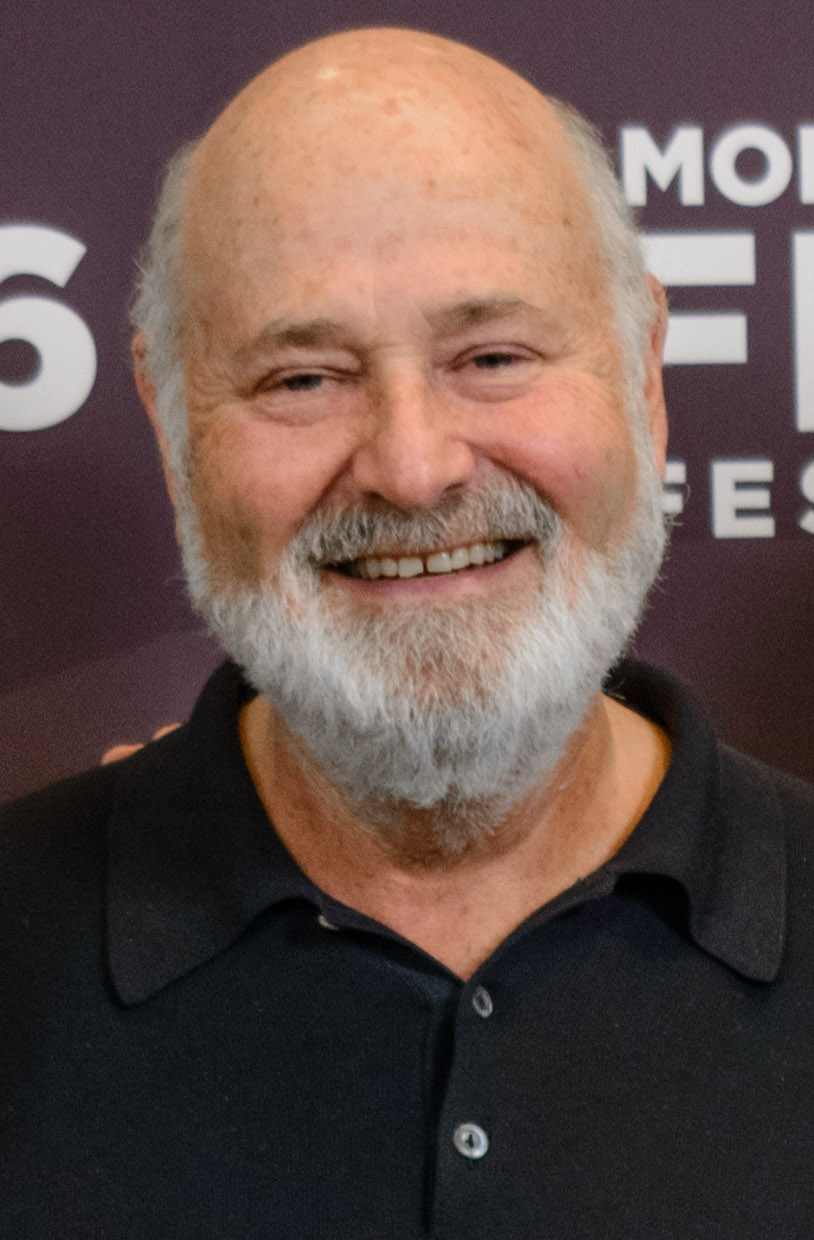
Rob Reiner

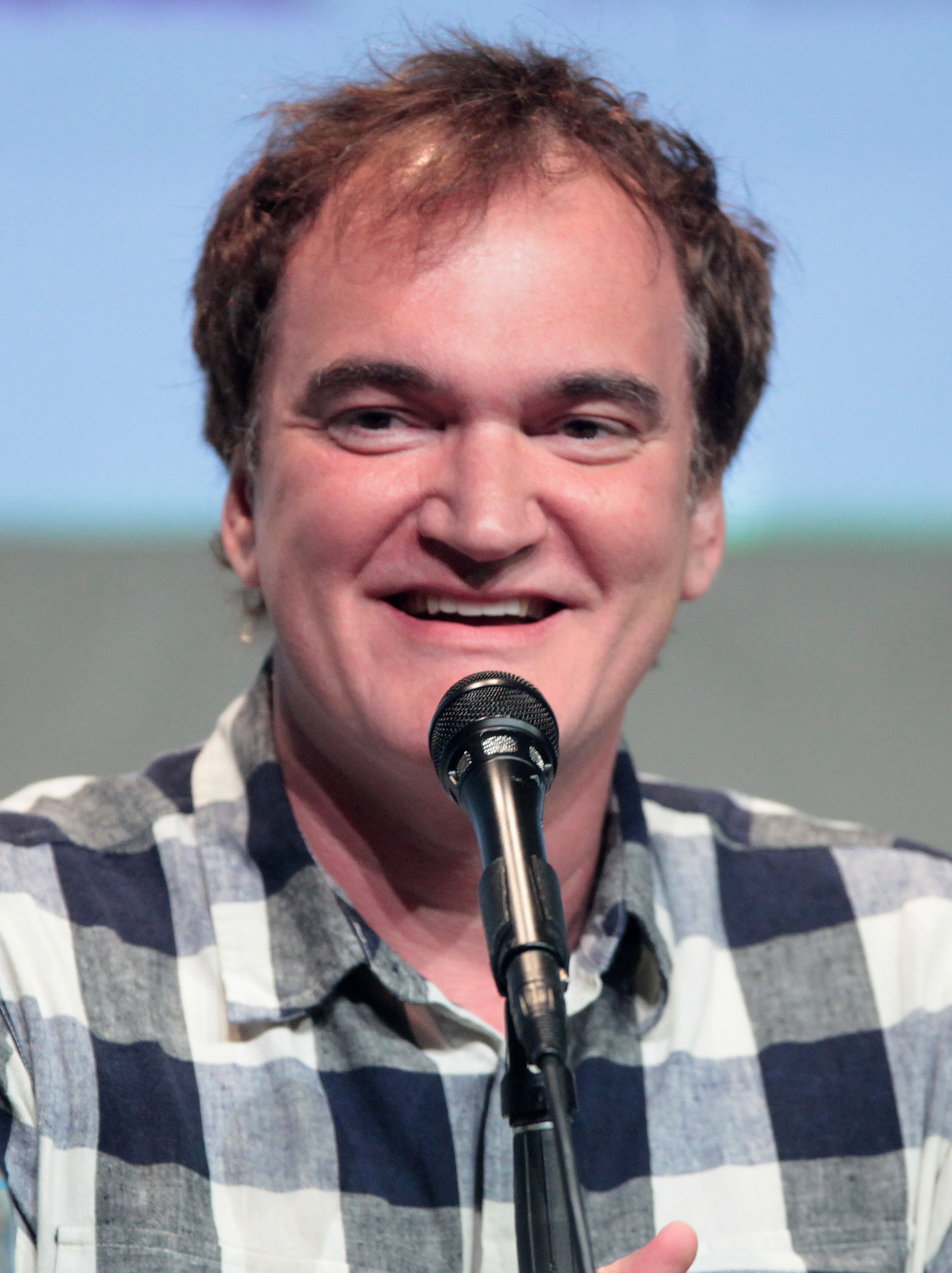
Quentin Tarantino

- J. J. Abrams
- Woody Allen
- Amir Bar-Lev
- Janine Sherman Barrois
- Greg Berlanti
- Jay Blakesberg
- Ken Burns
- Betty Cantor-Jackson
- Jonathan Cerullo
- Debra Martin Chase
- Peter Chernin
- Bruce Cohen
- Michael Connelly
- Lee Daniels
- Scott Derrickson
- Dayton Duncan
- Ava DuVernay
- Jan Eliasberg
- Kerstin Emhoff (ex-wife of Doug Emhoff)
- Susan Fales-Hill
- Ralph Farquhar
- Paul Feig
- Mike Flanagan
- Josh Fox
- Bryan Fuller
- Caroline Giuliani
- David Grubin
- Sands Hall
- Jeremy O. Harris
- Carl Hiaasen
- Matt Hubbard
- Reginald Hudlin
- Armando Iannucci
- Patty Jenkins
- Miranda July
- Marta Kauffman
- Rory Kennedy
- Eric Kripke
- Tony Kushner
- Spike Lee
- Damon Lindelof
- Laura Lippman
- Attica Locke
- Don Mancini
- Merrill Markoe
- Crystal McCrary
- Paola Mendoza
- Jerry Mitchell
- Michael Moore
- Jennifer Siebel Newsom (Independent)
- Denise Okuda
- Alexander Payne
- George Pelecanos
- Gina Prince-Bythewood
- Rob Reiner
- Shonda Rhimes
- Jordan Roth
- Jeffrey Seller
- Tanya Selvaratnam
- Tiffany Shlain
- Kevin Smith
- Aaron Sorkin
- Daniel Stamm
- Jonathan Taplin
- Quentin Tarantino
- Aliki Theofilopoulos
- Anne Thomopoulos
- Liesl Tommy
- Jill Twiss
- Mario Van Peebles
- Scott Wittman
- George C. Wolfe
- Danny Zuker

== Game designers ==
- Peter Adkison
- Larry Ahern
- Lou Anders
- Shannon Appelcline
- Keith Baker
- Cam Banks
- Andrew Bates
- Linda M. Bingle
- Bill Bridges
- Cameron Brown
- Timothy Brown
- Jennifer Brozek
- Phil Brucato
- Jim Butler
- Jason Carl
- Elizabeth Carpenter
- Michele Carter
- Jamie Chambers
- John Chambers
- Sam Chupp
- David Cook
- Sue Weinlein Cook
- Jeremy Crawford
- Liz Danforth
- Richard Dansky
- Jeff Dee
- Dennis Detwiller
- Kate Edwards
- Mike Elliott
- Larry Elmore
- Jason Engle
- James Ernest
- Rose Estes
- Sean Patrick Fannon
- Matt Forbeck
- Daniel D. Fox
- Carl Frank
- Crystal Frasier
- David Gallaher
- Anthony J. Gallela
- Richard Garfield
- Justin Gary
- Ajit George
- Adam Scott Glancy
- Scott Fitzgerald Gray
- Jeff Grubb
- Bruce Harlick
- Jess Hartley
- Rebecca Heineman
- Rob Heinsoo
- Jennifer Hepler
- Jack Herman
- Tracy Hickman
- Fred Hicks
- Tyler Hinman
- Jeremy Holcomb
- Miranda Horner
- Wei-Hwa Huang
- Heather Hudson
- Shane Ivey
- Steve Jackson
- J. Hunter Johnson
- Tom Jolly
- Tim Kask
- Darwin Kastle
- Steve Kenson
- Mary Kirchoff
- Raph Koster
- Amanda Hamon Kunz
- Matt Leacock
- Robert Leighton
- Nicole Lindroos
- Andy Looney
- James Lowder
- T. S. Luikart
- Ari Marmell
- Stephen R. Marsh
- Colin McComb
- Angel Leigh McCoy
- Mike Mearls
- Steve Meretzky
- Steve Miller
- Christian Moore
- Roger E. Moore
- Dave Morris
- John Nephew
- Bruce Nesmith
- Eric Neustadter
- Steffan O'Sullivan
- Trip Payne
- Ed Pegg Jr.
- Chris Perkins
- Steve Peterson
- Chris Pierson
- Stefan Pokorny
- Randy Post
- Chris Pramas
- Anthony Pryor
- Lewis Pulsipher
- Sheri Graner Ray
- Philip Reed
- Sean K. Reynolds
- Mark Rosewater
- S. John Ross
- Scott Rouse
- Charles Ryan
- Steven Schend
- Robert J. Schwalb
- Jesse Scoble
- Mike Selinker
- Gareth-Michael Skarka
- Bill Slavicsek
- Lester W. Smith
- Ree Soesbee
- Warren Spector
- Michael A. Stackpole
- Stan!
- Ed Stark
- David Steinberg
- Owen K.C. Stephens
- Lisa Stevens
- Harley Stroh
- James L. Sutter
- Dave Taylor
- Mark Tedin
- Cat Tobin
- Mike Turian
- Jonathan Tweet
- John Scott Tynes
- Monica Valentinelli
- Gavin Verhey
- Eric B. Vogel
- Ross Watson
- John Wick
- Steve Wieck
- Skip Williams
- Ray Winninger
- Steve Winter
- James Wyatt
- John Zinser

== Media personalities and television hosts ==
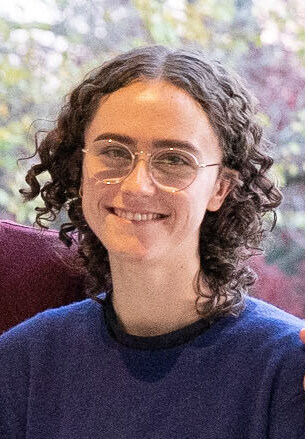
Ella Emhoff

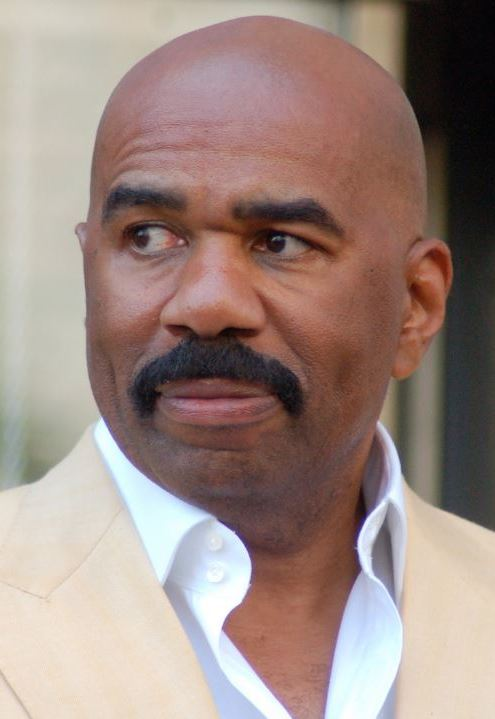
Steve Harvey

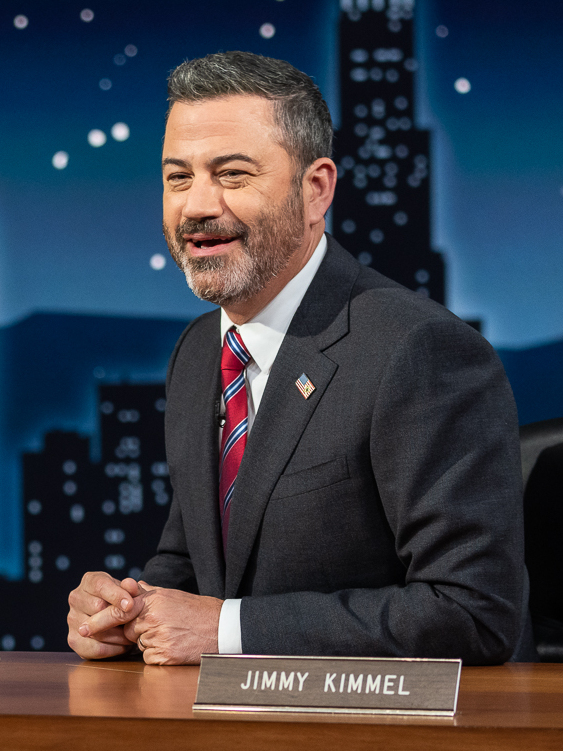
Jimmy Kimmel

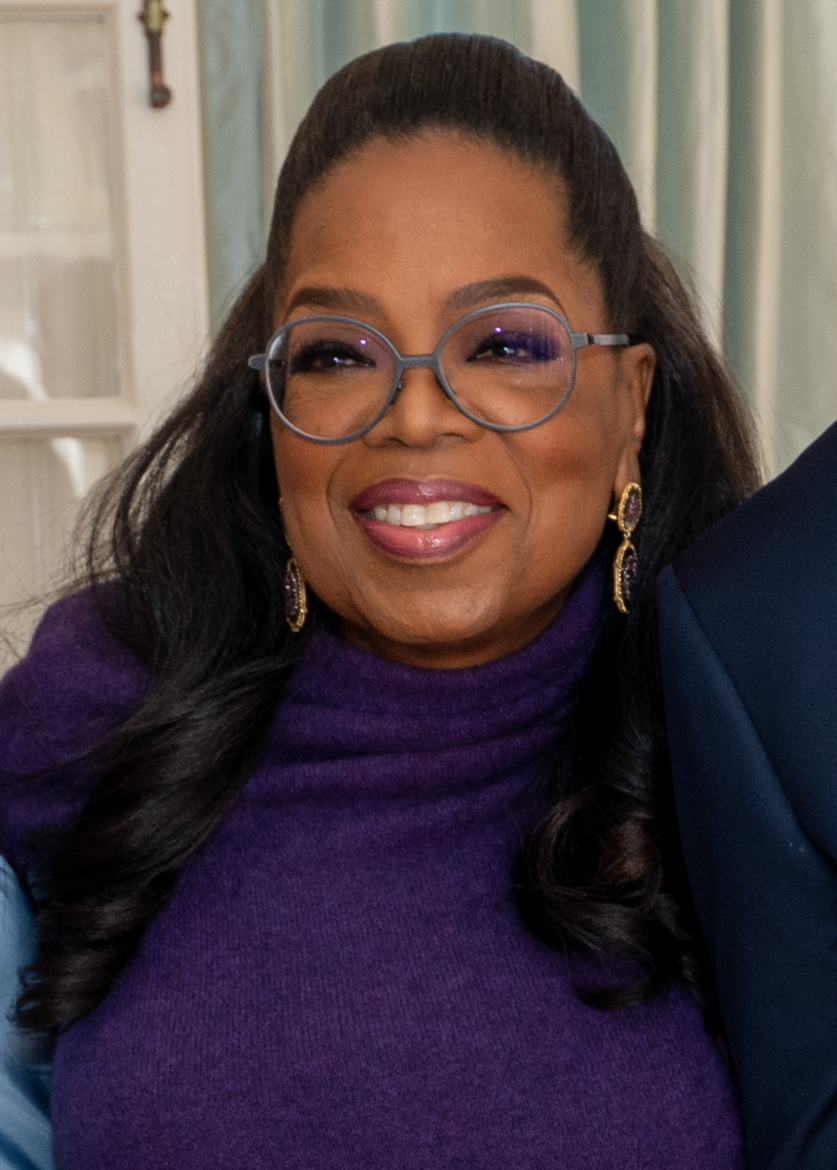
Oprah Winfrey

- AustinShow
- Knowa De Baraso
- BenDeLaCreme
- Hailey Bieber
- Steven Kenneth "Destiny" Bonnell II, live streamer and political commentator
- Nick Cho
- Lenora Claire
- Andy Cohen
- Jackie Cox
- Kamie Crawford
- Brooklyn Decker
- Ty Defoe
- Cara Delevingne
- Ella Emhoff (candidate's step-daughter)
- David Evangelista
- Mignon Fogarty
- Connor Franta
- Silky Nutmeg Ganache
- Merle Ginsberg
- Charlamagne tha God
- Frankie Grande
- Hank Green
- Ambra Gutierrez
- Nic Harcourt
- Steve Harvey
- Glenda Hatchett
- James Holzhauer
- Sunny Hostin
- Georgia May Jagger
- JiDion
- Bailey Anne Kennedy
- Jimmy Kimmel
- Karlie Kloss
- Padma Lakshmi
- Ruth Langsford
- Lourdes Leon
- David Letterman
- Shin Lim
- Erin Macdonald
- Honey Mahogany
- Chad Michaels
- Tana Mongeau
- Jinkx Monsoon
- Bill Nye
- Tyler Oakley
- Conan O'Brien
- Carré Otis
- Ashlee Marie Preston
- Pokimane
- Geena Rocero
- Donna Sachet
- Johanna Schneller
- Stephen A. Smith
- V Spehar
- Howard Stern
- Rick Steves
- Martha Stewart
- Sykkuno
- Chrissy Teigen
- Evo Terra
- Colton Underwood
- Valentina
- Valkyrae
- Jonathan Van Ness
- Vaush
- Nina West
- Montel Williams
- Nymphia Wind
- Oprah Winfrey
- Dean Withers
- Sara Ziff

== Musicians ==
=== Bands ===
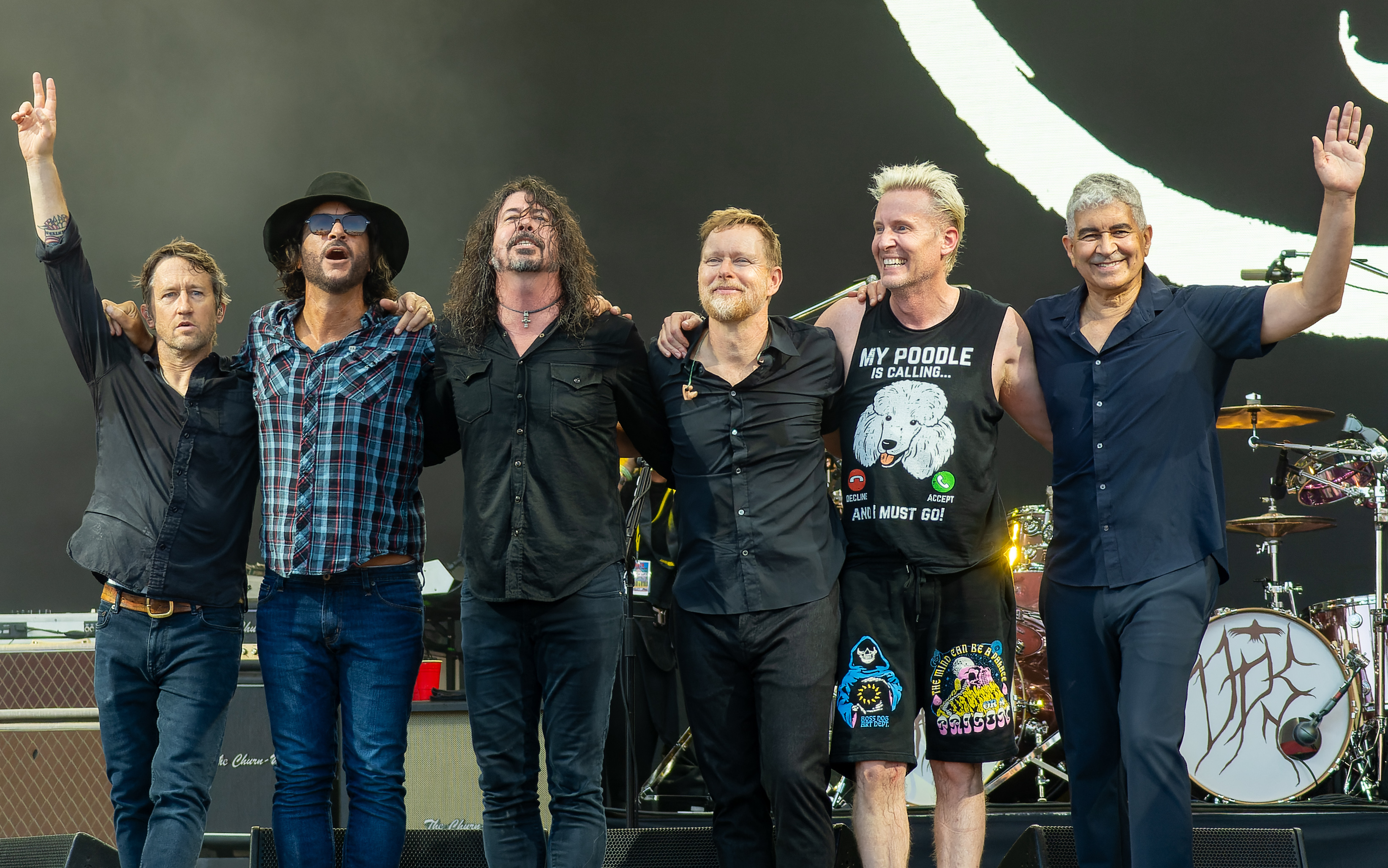
Foo Fighters

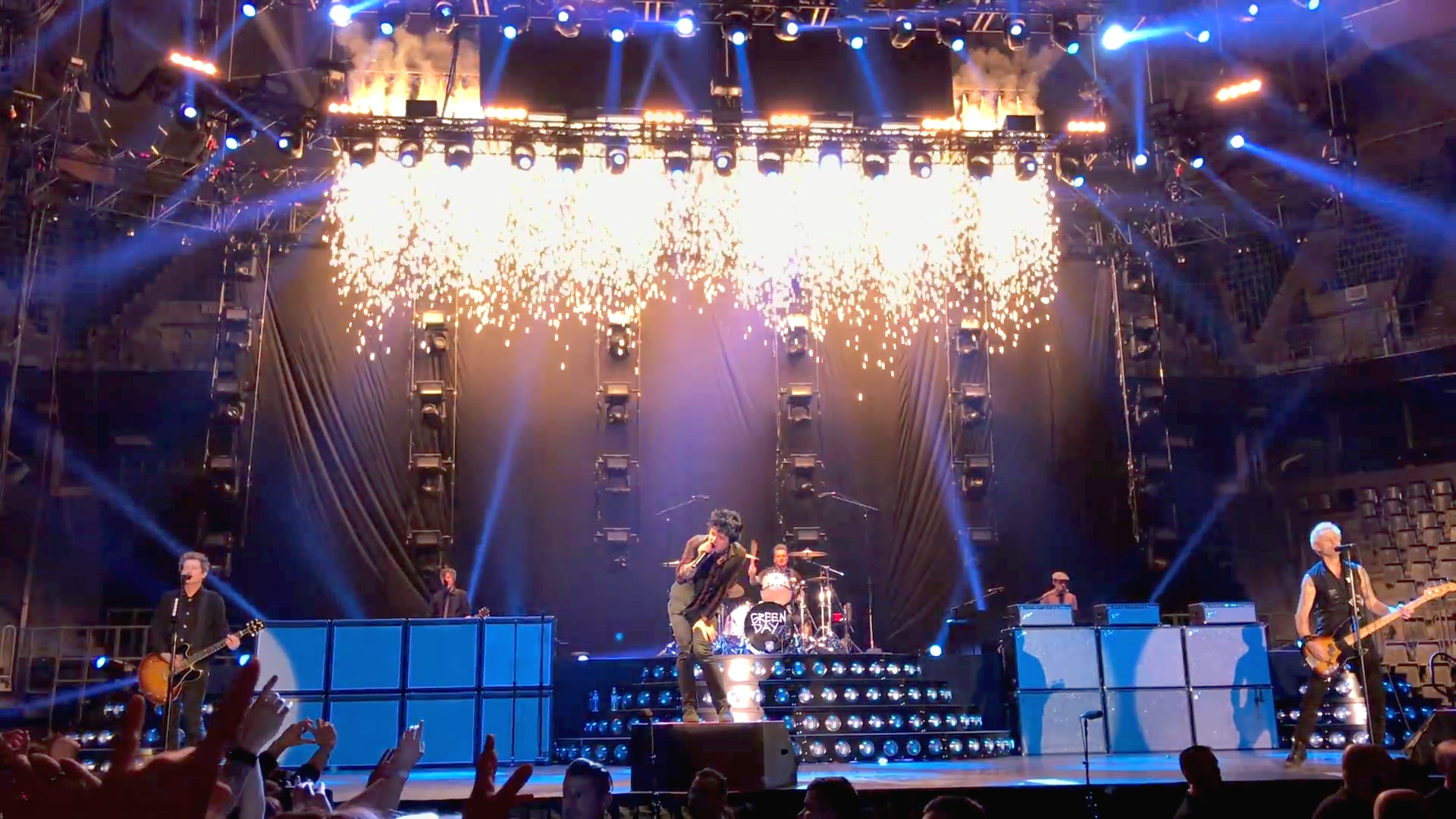
Green Day

- Aly & AJ
- American Aquarium
- American Patchwork Quartet
- Animal Liberation Orchestra
- The B-52s
- Bon Iver
- Brothers Osborne
- Charming Disaster
- The Chicks
- Dark Star Orchestra
- Devo
- Drive-By Truckers
- Dumpstaphunk
- Evanescence
- Foo Fighters
- Green Day
- The Head and the Heart
- Hot Tuna
- The Isley Brothers
- Jefferson Starship
- Jimmy Eat World
- Living Colour
- Los Lobos
- Los Tigres del Norte
- Maná
- Mary Lee's Corvette
- Medusa
- Mumford & Sons
- My Morning Jacket
- The National
- New Radicals
- The Paranoid Style
- Paul and Storm
- Reckless Kelly
- Rising Appalachia
- The Roots
- Senses
- Sleater-Kinney
- Sofi Tukker
- Swans
- Team Dresch
- The War and Treaty
- X Ambassadors
- Yo La Tengo

==== Composers, DJs, and instrumentalists ====
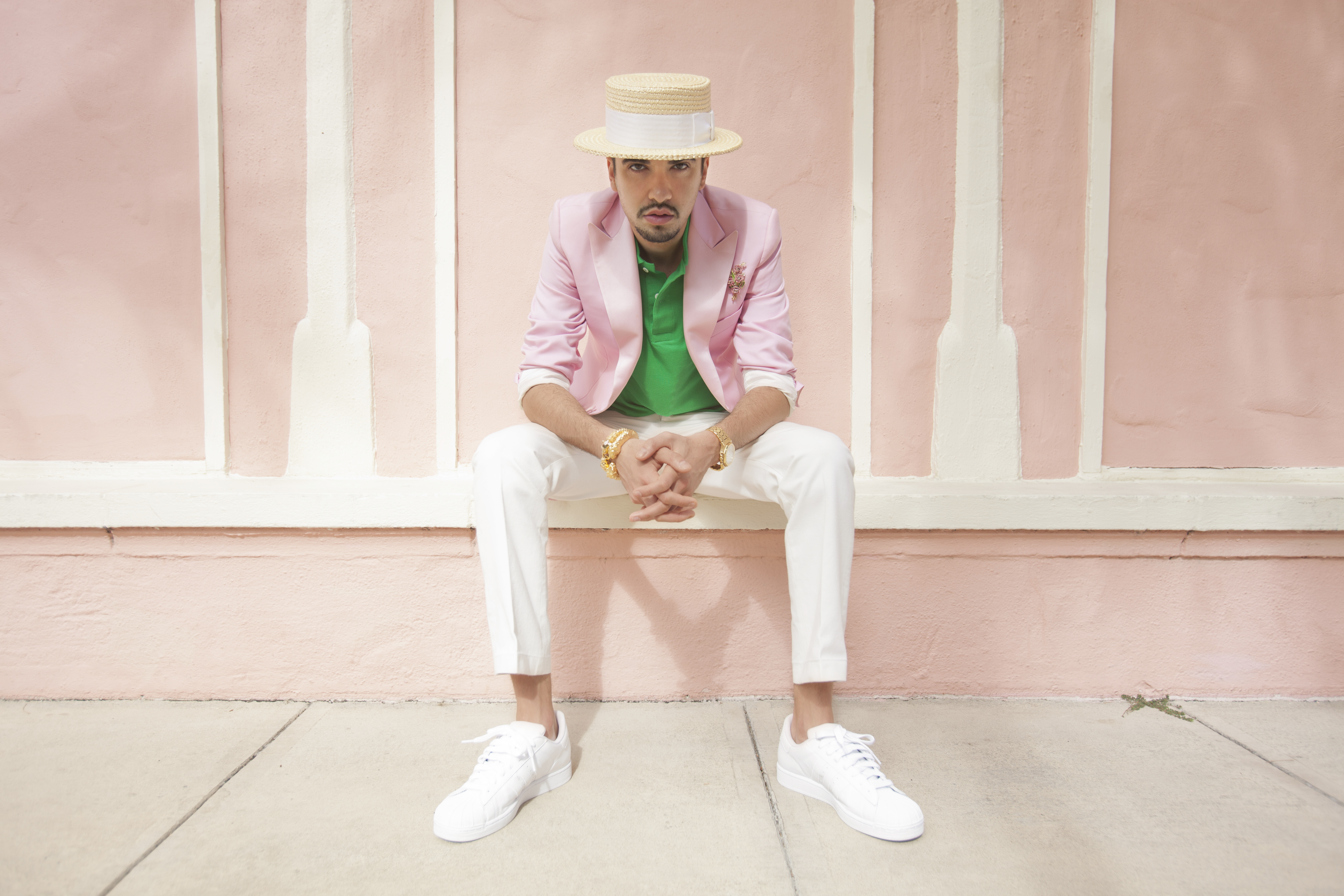
DJ Cassidy

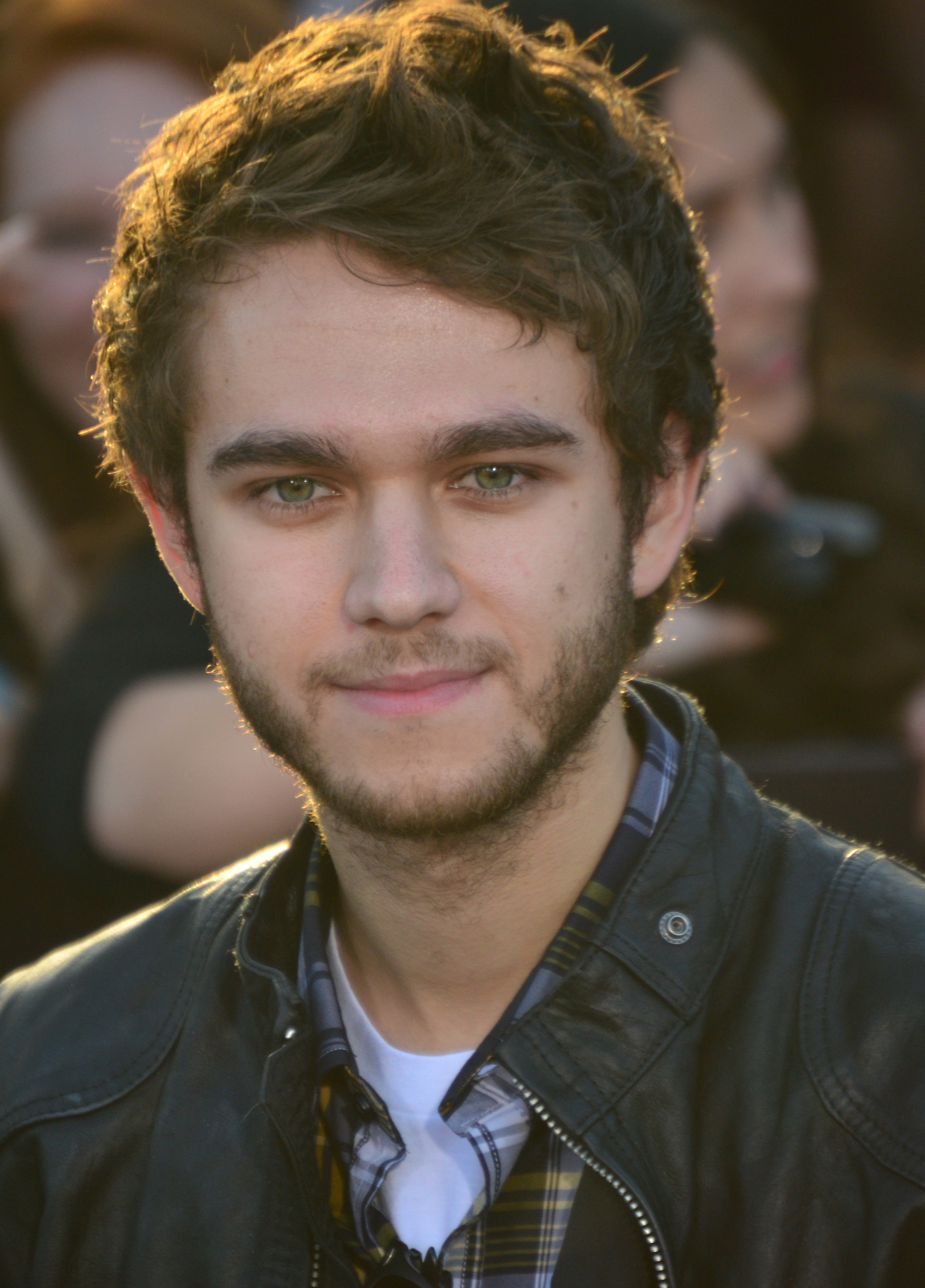
Zedd

- Emanuel Ax
- Kenny Barron
- Adam Blackstone
- Just Blaze
- Holly Bowling
- Ron Carter
- Bootsy Collins
- John Densmore
- DJ Cassidy
- DJ D-Nice
- DJ Jazzy Jeff
- DJ Logic
- DJ Scratch
- Lara Downes
- Dave Ellis
- Al Foster
- Jackie Fox
- Peter Frampton
- Chris Funk
- Zach Gill
- LP Giobbi
- Robert Glasper
- Siddhartha Khosla
- Tommy Lee
- Andrew Lippa
- Joe Lovano
- Yo-Yo Ma
- Christian McBride
- Alan Menken
- MonoNeon
- Jason Moran
- Ivan Neville
- Benj Pasek
- Justin Paul
- George Porter Jr.
- Questlove
- A. R. Rahman
- Joshua Redman
- Joe Russo
- Stephen Schwartz
- Ketch Secor
- Marc Shaiman
- Jeanine Tesori
- Elijah Wald
- Jeff "Tain" Watts
- Zedd

=== Rappers ===
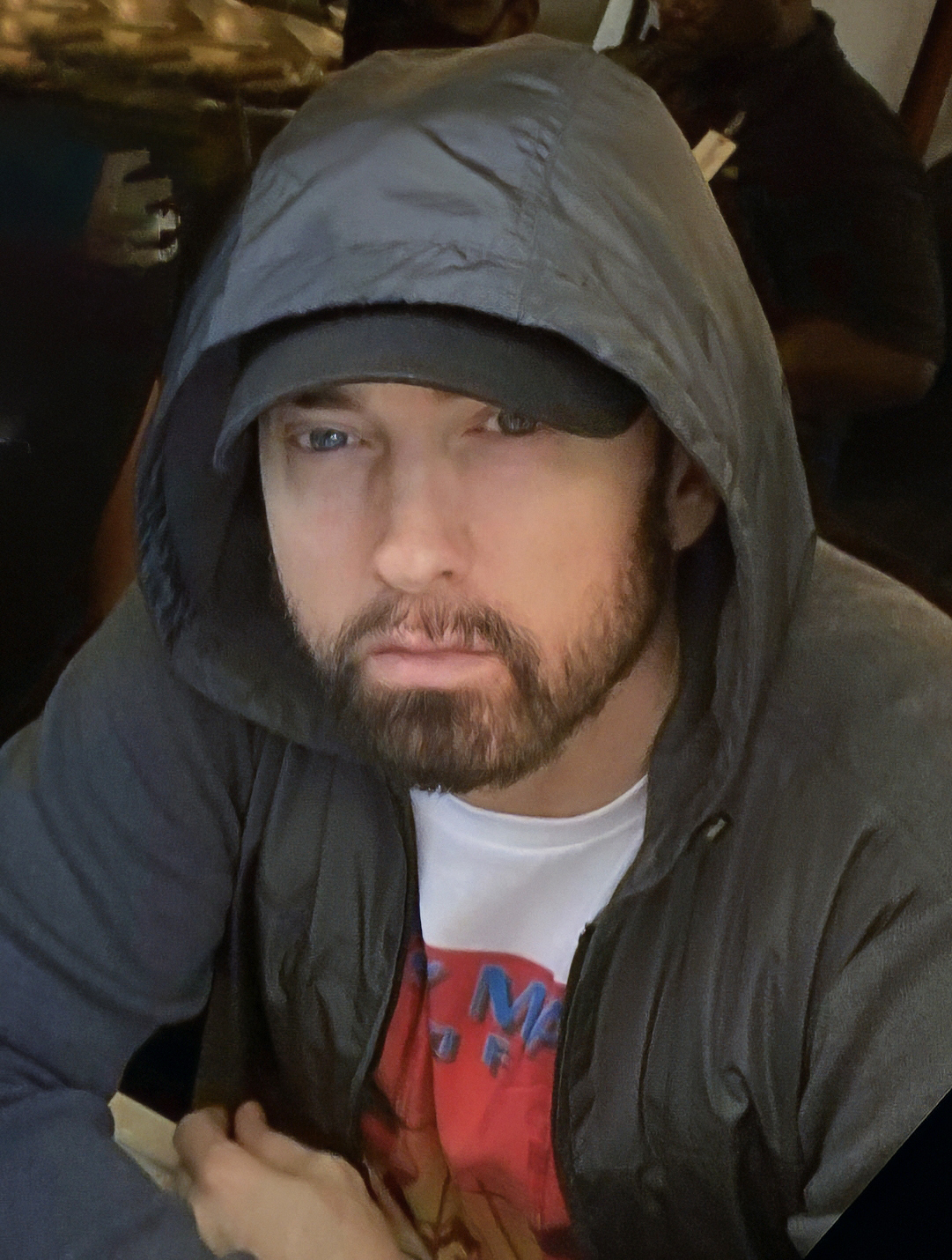
Eminem

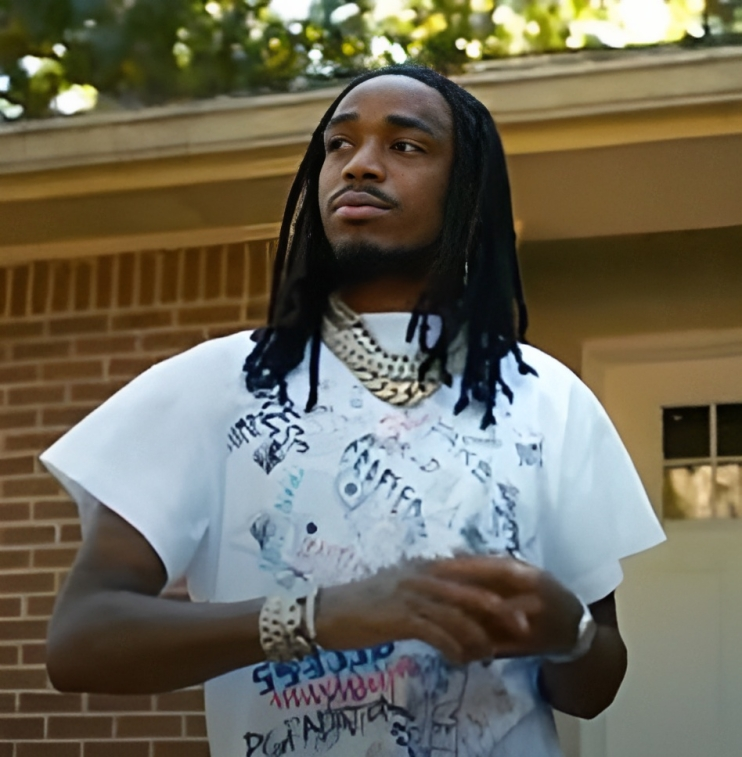
Quavo

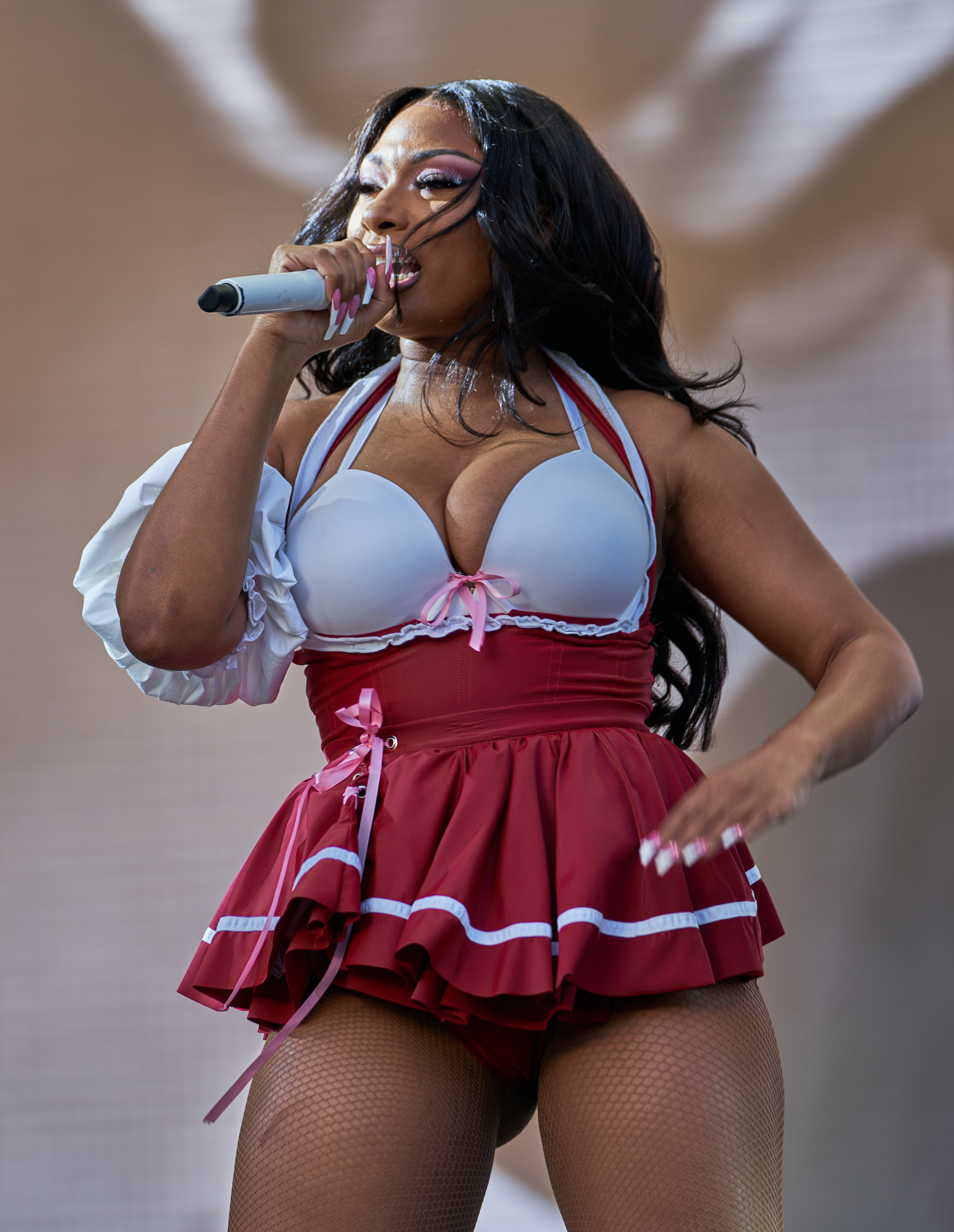
Megan Thee Stallion

- 2 Chainz
- apl.de.ap
- Cardi B
- Eric B.
- Azealia Banks (previously endorsed Donald Trump; later voted for Trump anyway)
- Bad Bunny
- Baba Brinkman
- Chance the Rapper
- Common
- Jermaine Dupri
- Eminem
- Freeway
- GloRilla
- Qveen Herby
- Raheem Jarbo
- Fat Joe
- Queen Latifah
- Lil Jon
- Lil Nas X
- Lizzo
- Uncle Luke
- MC Lyte
- Yung Miami
- Flo Milli
- Derek Minor
- Plies
- Quavo
- Dice Raw
- Sexyy Red (previously endorsed Donald Trump)
- Beanie Sigel
- Megan Thee Stallion
- Slim Thug
- Big Tigger
- Pastor Troy
- Violent J
- Armani White
- Jarobi White
- will.i.am

=== Singers and songwriters ===
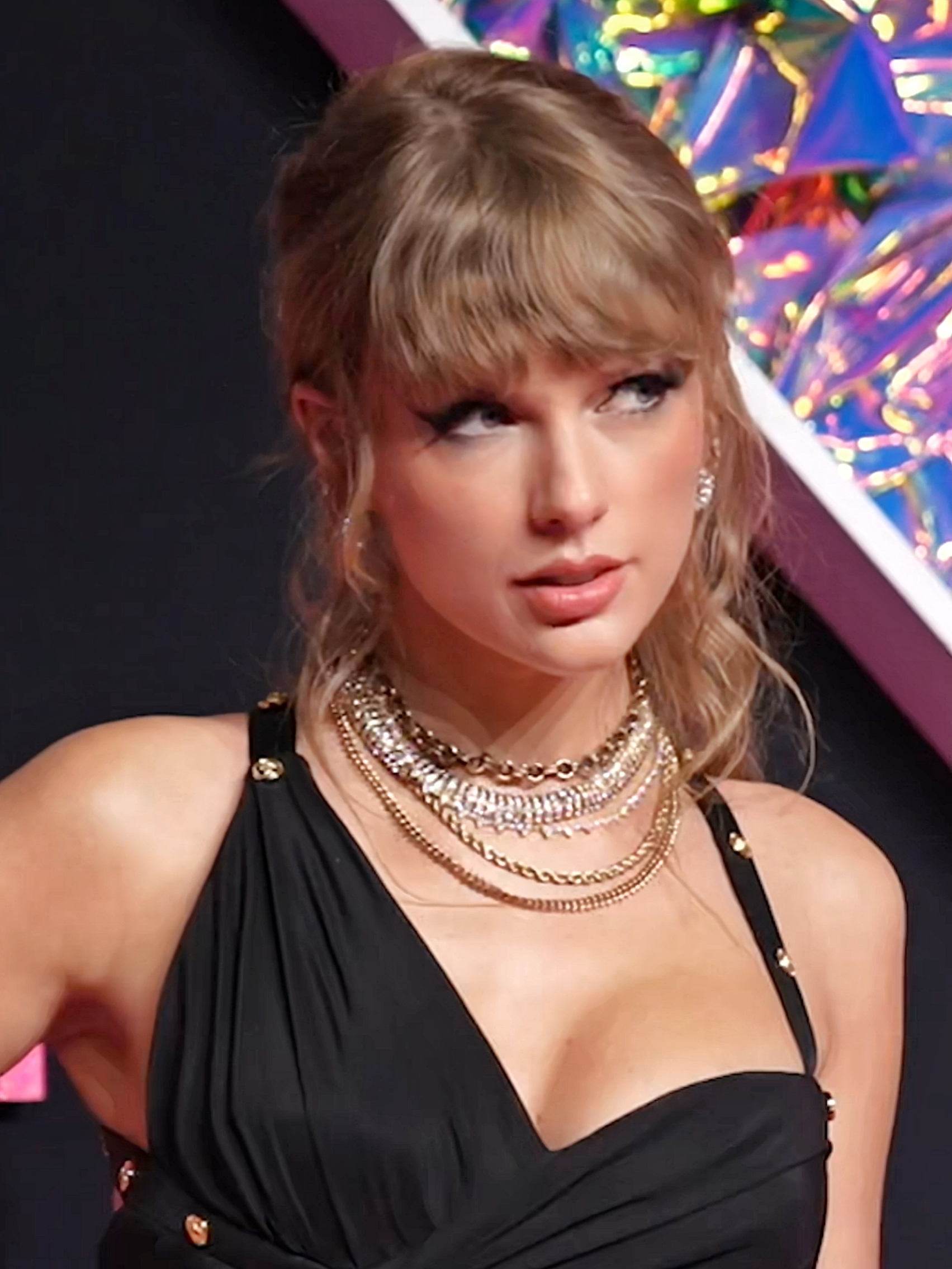
Taylor Swift

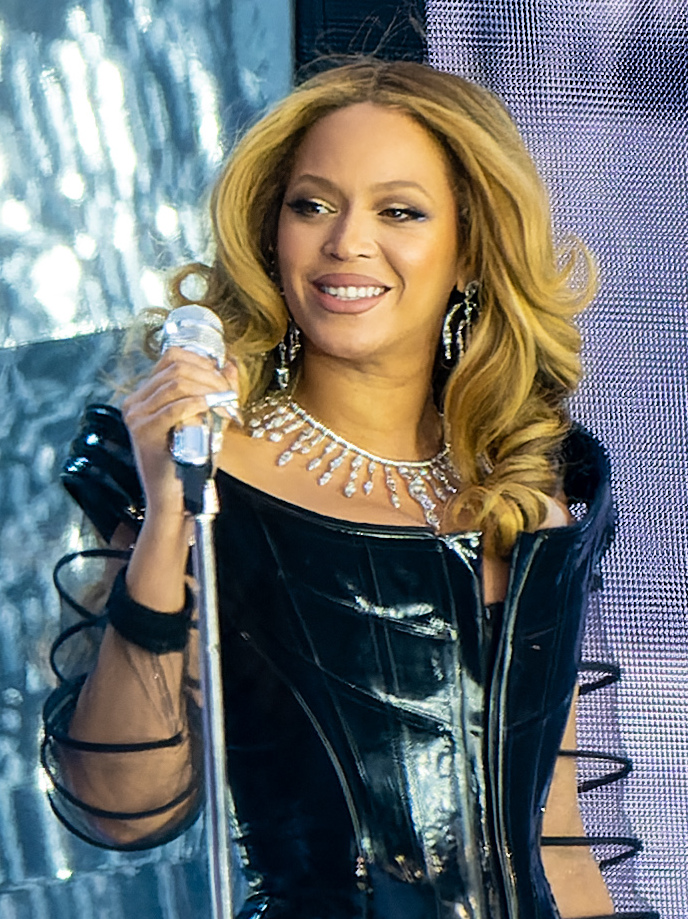
Beyoncé

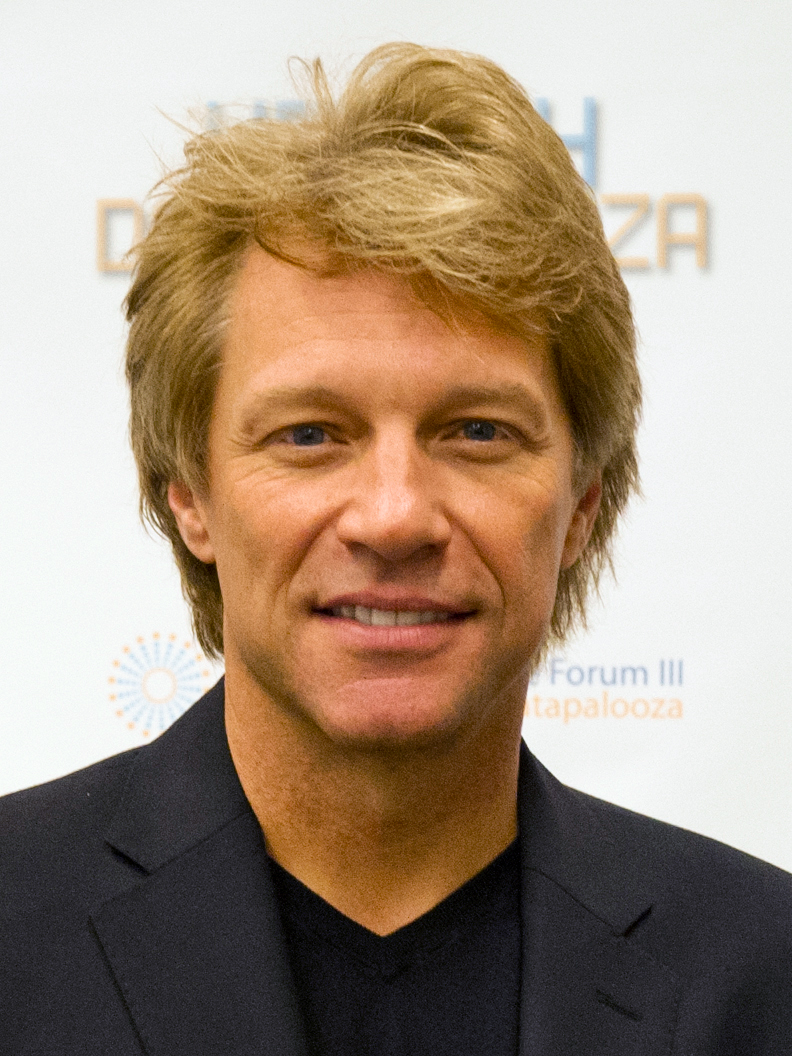
Jon Bon Jovi

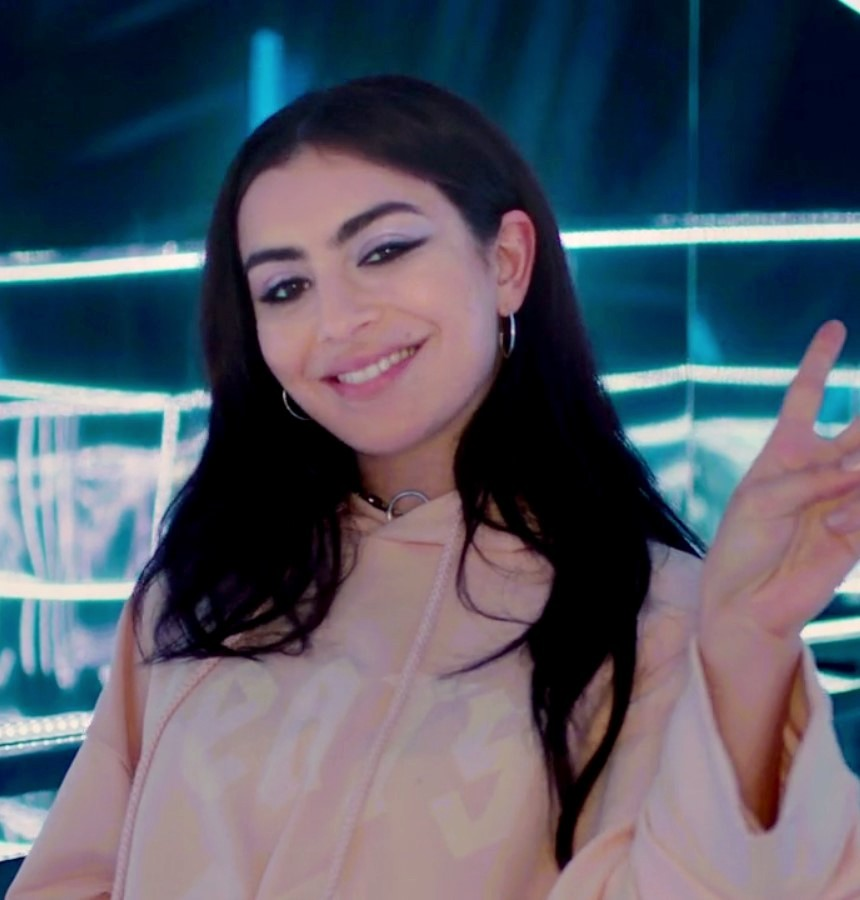
Charli XCX

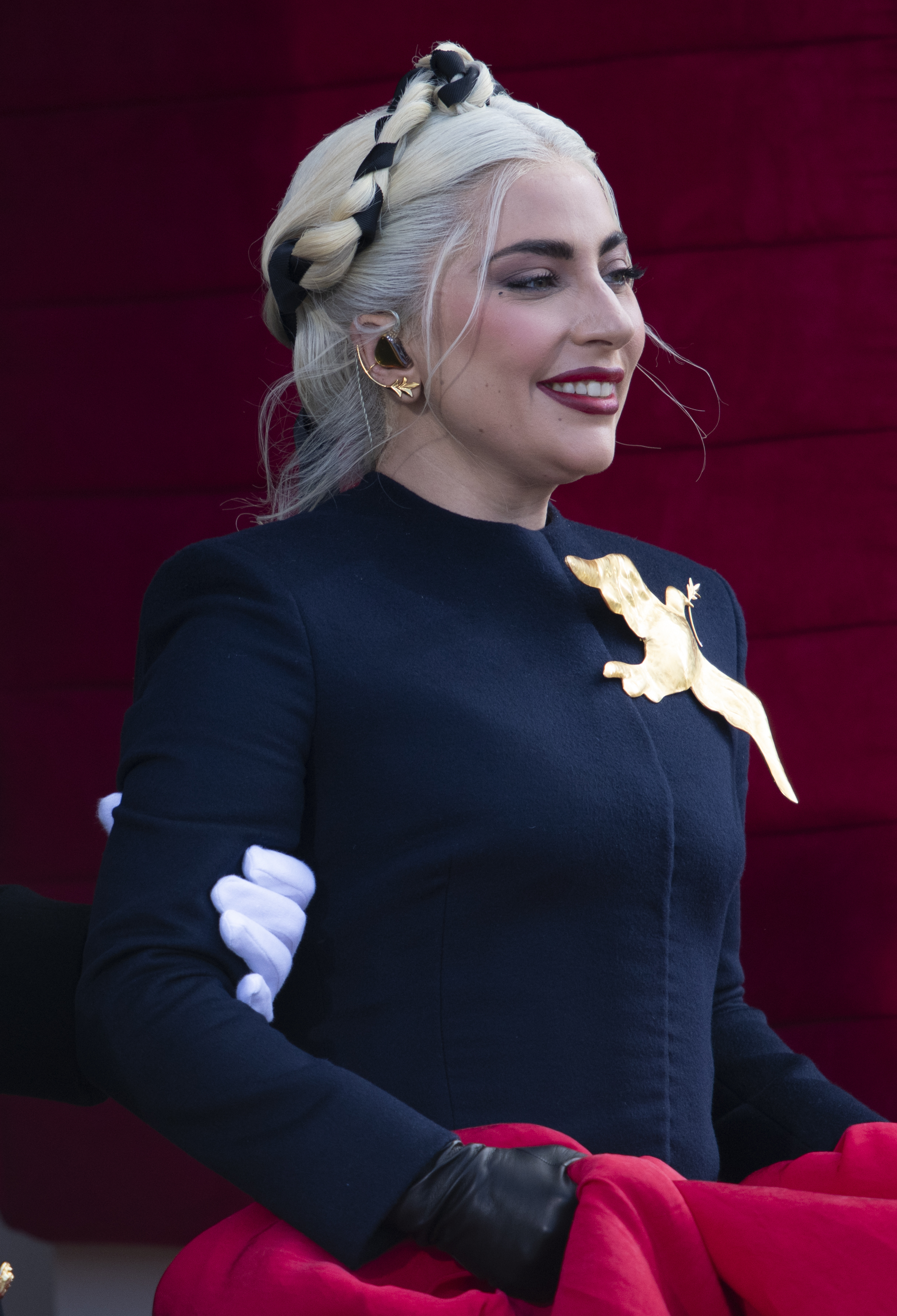
Lady Gaga

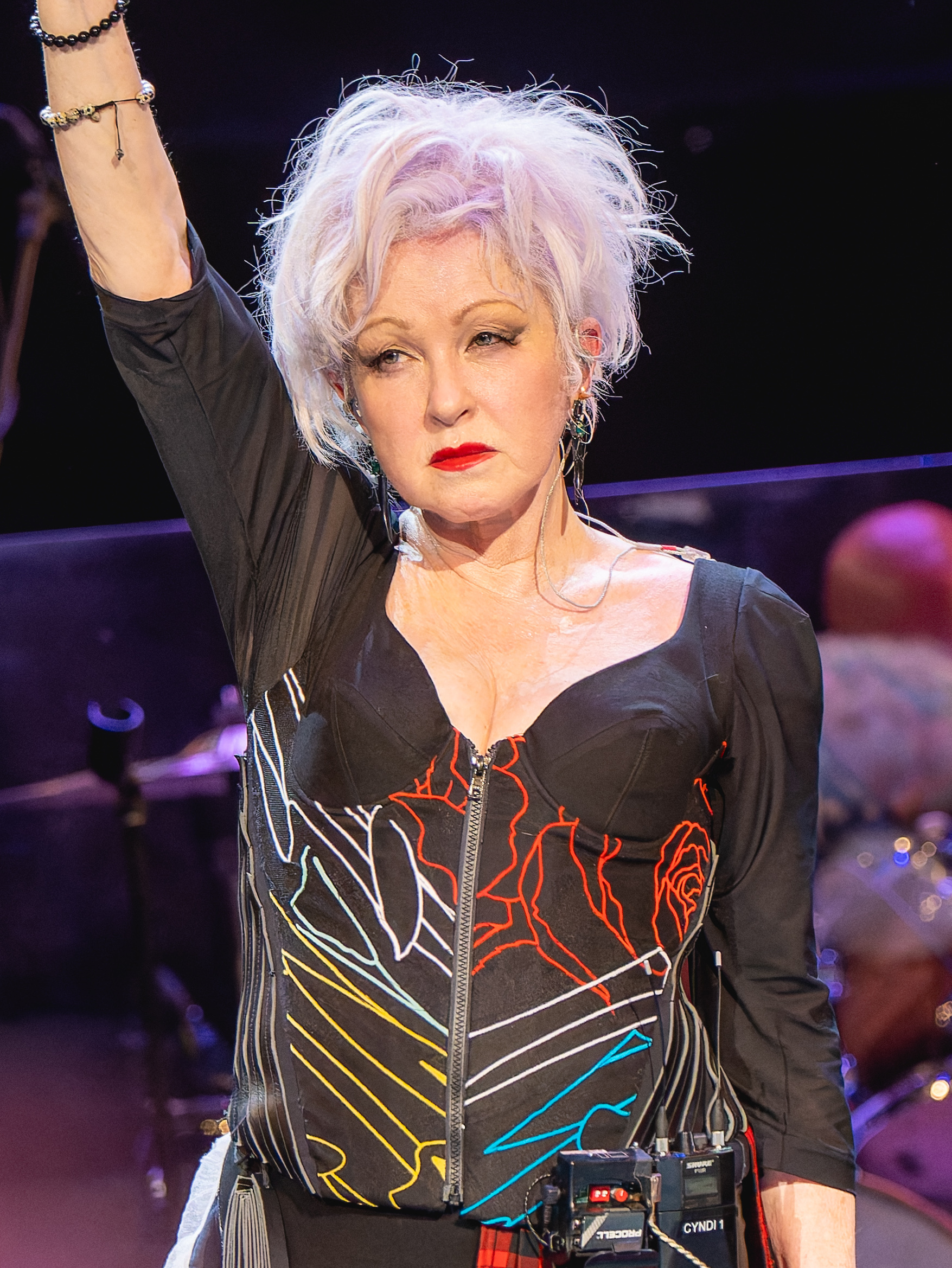
Cyndi Lauper

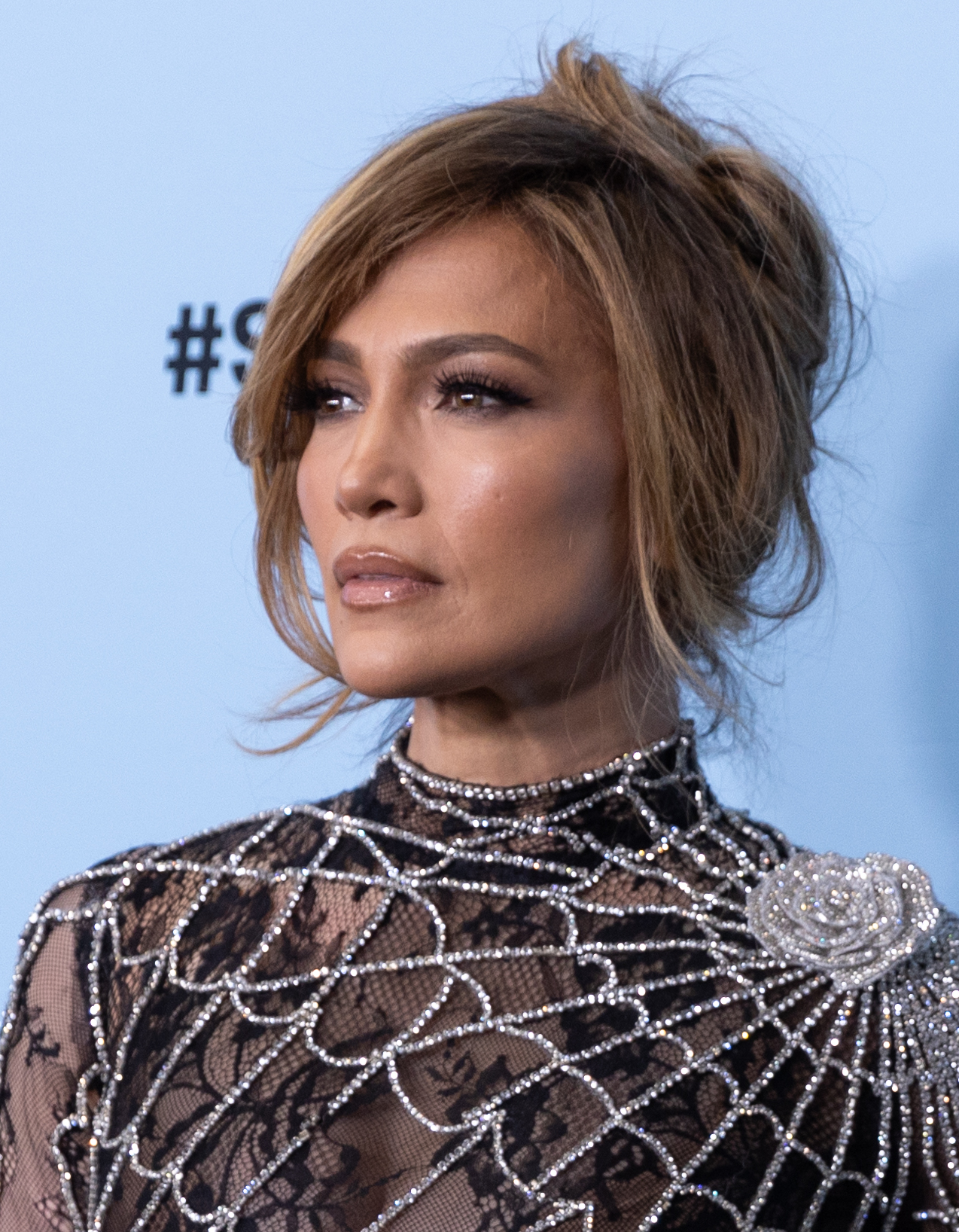
Jennifer Lopez

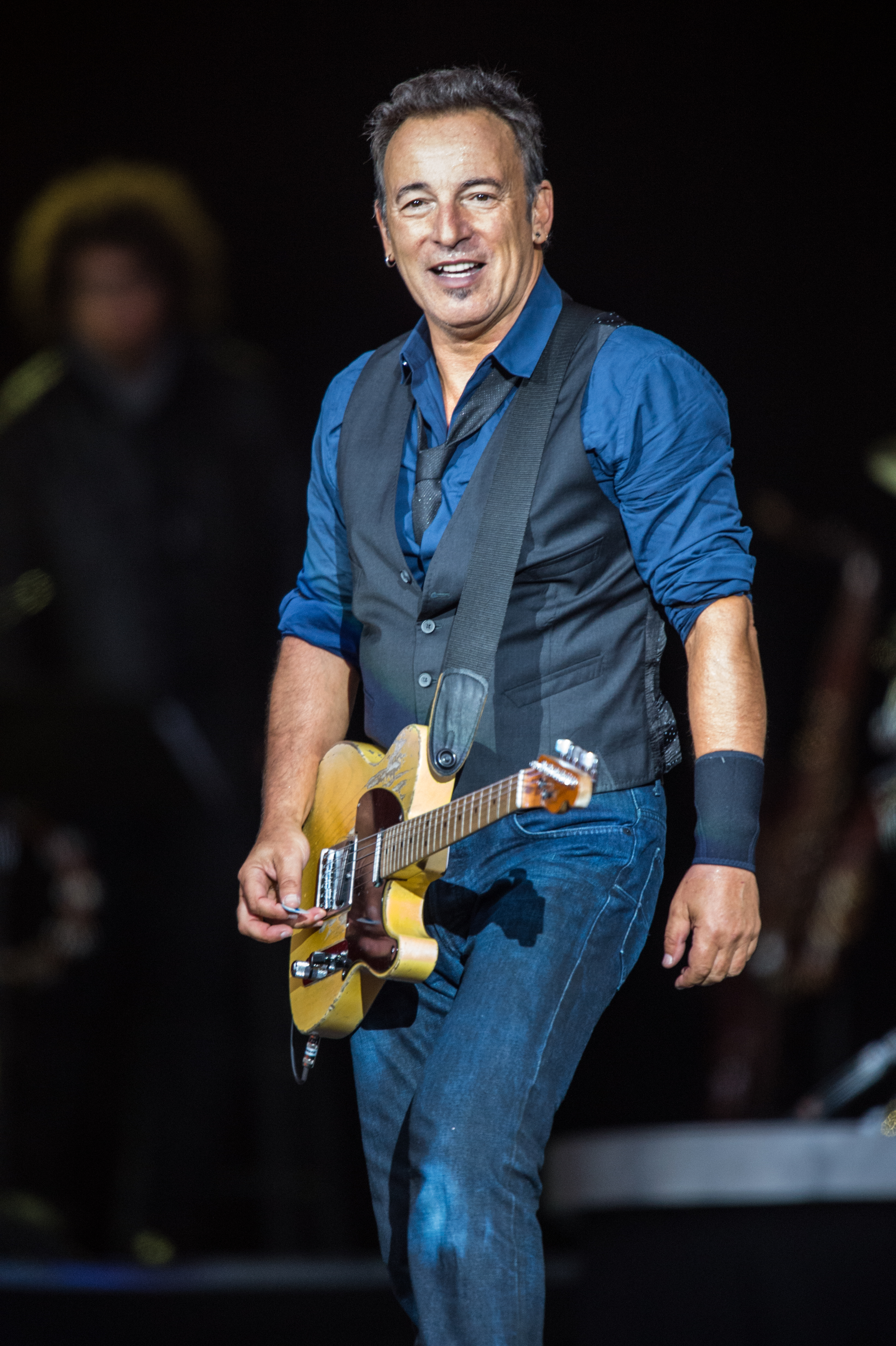
Bruce Springsteen

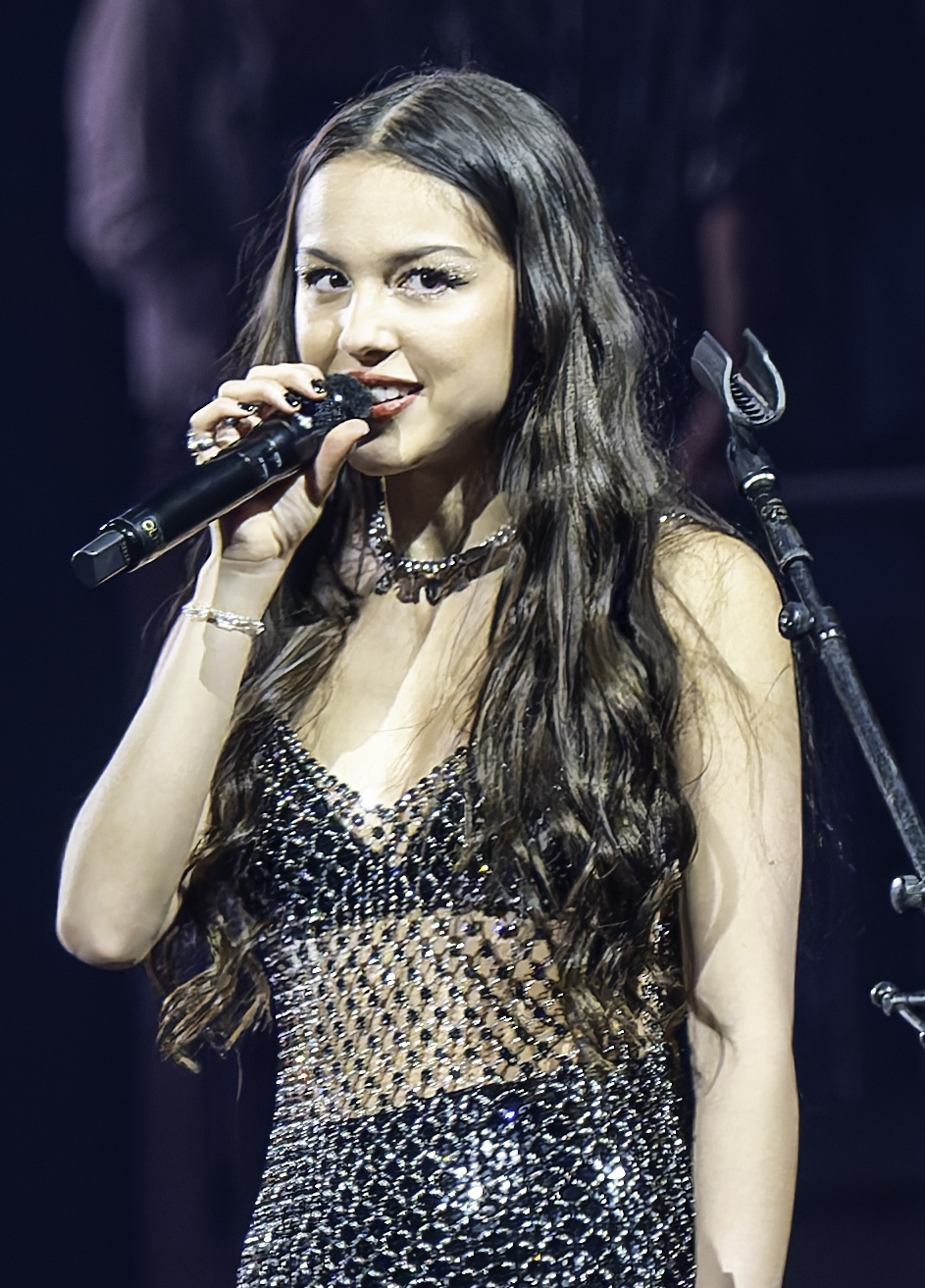
Olivia Rodrigo

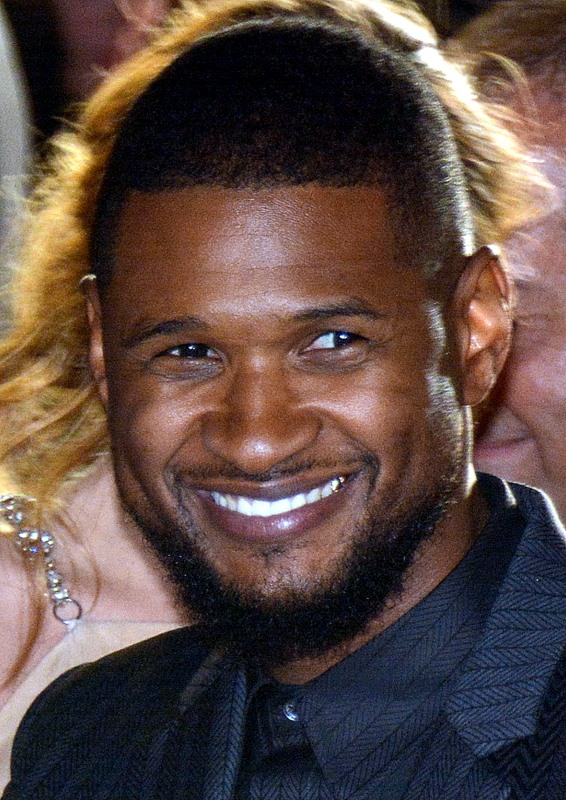
Usher

- Gracie Abrams
- Christina Aguilera
- Marc Anthony
- Emily Armstrong
- Sebastian Bach
- Joan Baez
- Chloe Bailey
- Halle Bailey
- Sara Bareilles
- Lance Bass
- Sunshine Becker
- Durand Bernarr
- Matt Berninger
- Beyoncé
- Kid Beyond
- Elvin Bishop
- Jon Bon Jovi
- Justin Vivian Bond
- Dee Dee Bridgewater
- Ann Hampton Callaway
- Erica Campbell
- Rosanne Cash
- Felix Cavaliere
- Charli XCX
- Cher
- Ciara
- George Clinton
- Paula Cole
- Wayne Coyne
- Miley Cyrus
- Davido
- Andra Day
- Aaron Dessner
- Joyce DiDonato
- Ricky Dillard
- Jennifer DiNoia
- Dixson
- Sheila E.
- Billie Eilish
- Ezra Furman
- Lady Gaga
- Kathryn Gallagher
- David Gans
- Selena Gomez
- Ariana Grande
- Josh Groban
- Mickey Guyton
- Malynda Hale
- Todrick Hall
- Anthony Hamilton
- Debbie Harry
- Nona Hendryx
- Magos Herrera
- Jason Isbell
- Mick Jagger
- Charles Jenkins
- Joan Jett
- Jack Johnson
- Gary Jules
- Noah Kahan
- Kesha
- Alicia Keys
- Carole King
- Emanuel Kiriakou
- Patti LaBelle
- Lachi
- Shelly Lares
- Laufey
- Cyndi Lauper
- John Legend
- Lisa Loeb
- Jennifer Lopez
- Demi Lovato
- Adrian Lyles
- Madonna
- Martie Maguire
- Natalie Maines
- Ricky Martin
- Maxwell
- Tom Maxwell
- AJ McLean
- Natalie Merchant
- AJ Michalka
- Aly Michalka
- Joni Mitchell
- Moby
- Janelle Monáe
- Victoria Monét
- Monica
- Mandy Moore
- Maren Morris
- Alanis Morissette
- Naturi Naughton
- Willie Nelson
- Stevie Nicks
- Coleen Nolan
- Finneas O'Connell
- Don Omar
- Nina Osegueda
- Stella Parton
- Katy Perry
- Glen Phillips
- Chris Pierce
- Pink
- Steve Poltz
- Margo Price
- Addison Rae
- Gretta Ray
- Rihanna
- Eric Roberson
- Smokey Robinson
- Olivia Rodrigo
- Linda Ronstadt
- Maggie Rose
- Kelly Rowland
- Seth Rudetsky
- Sia
- Nancy Sinatra
- Alex Skolnick
- Patti Smith
- Donita Sparks
- Brittney Spencer
- Bruce Springsteen
- Mavis Staples
- Michael Stipe
- Emily Strayer
- Barbra Streisand
- Jazmine Sullivan
- Emma Swift
- Taylor Swift
- Aaron Lee Tasjan
- James Taylor
- Justin Tranter
- Corin Tucker
- Dara Tucker
- Usher
- Justin Vernon
- St. Vincent
- Jessica Vosk
- Rufus Wainwright
- Eleri Ward
- Dionne Warwick
- Suki Waterhouse
- Bob Weir
- Betty Who
- Hayley Williams
- Lucinda Williams
- Victor Willis
- Avery Wilson
- Remi Wolf
- Stevie Wonder
- Jaime Wyatt
- Neil Young
- Nicole Zuraitis

== Novelists, authors, and poets ==
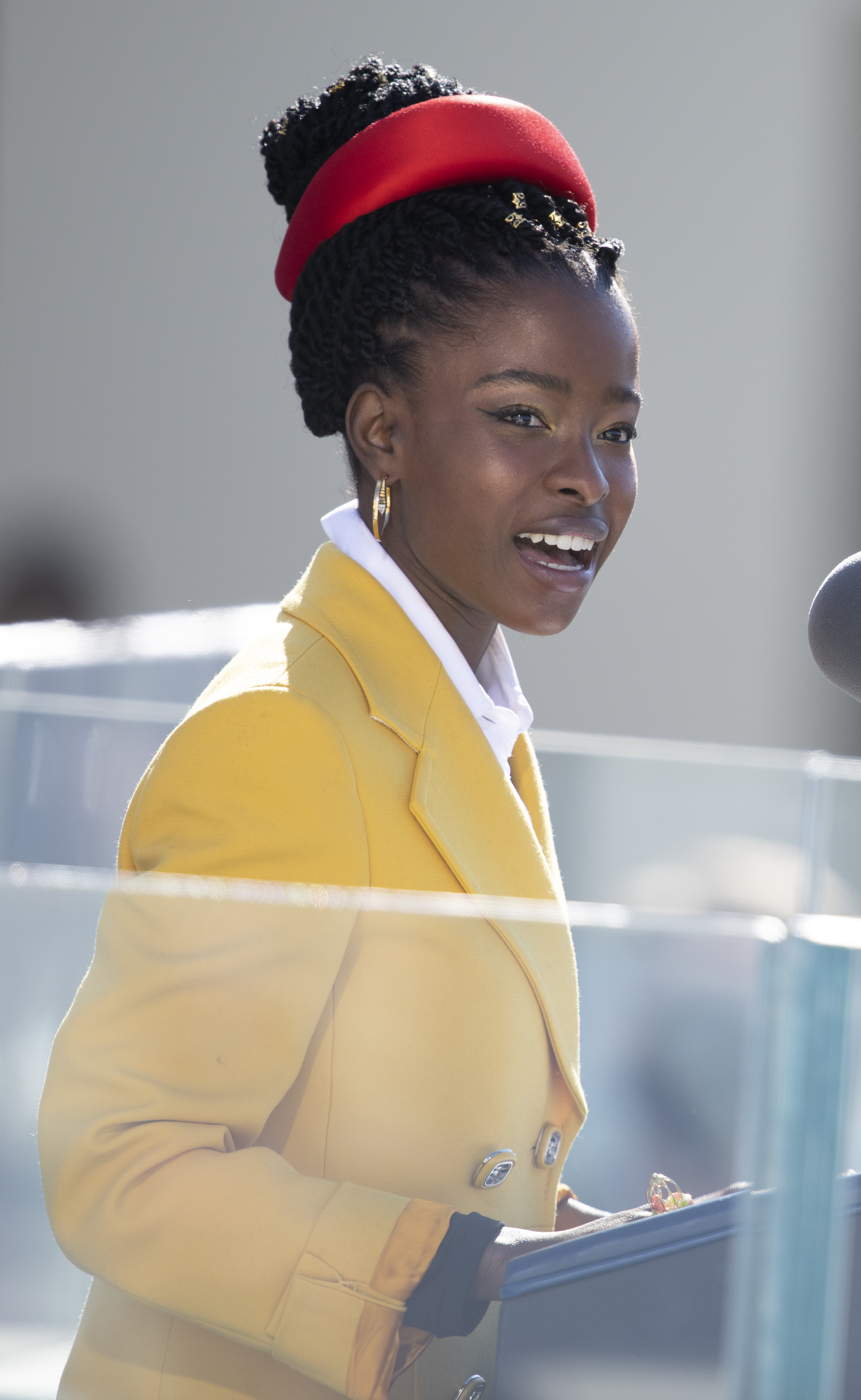
Amanda Gorman

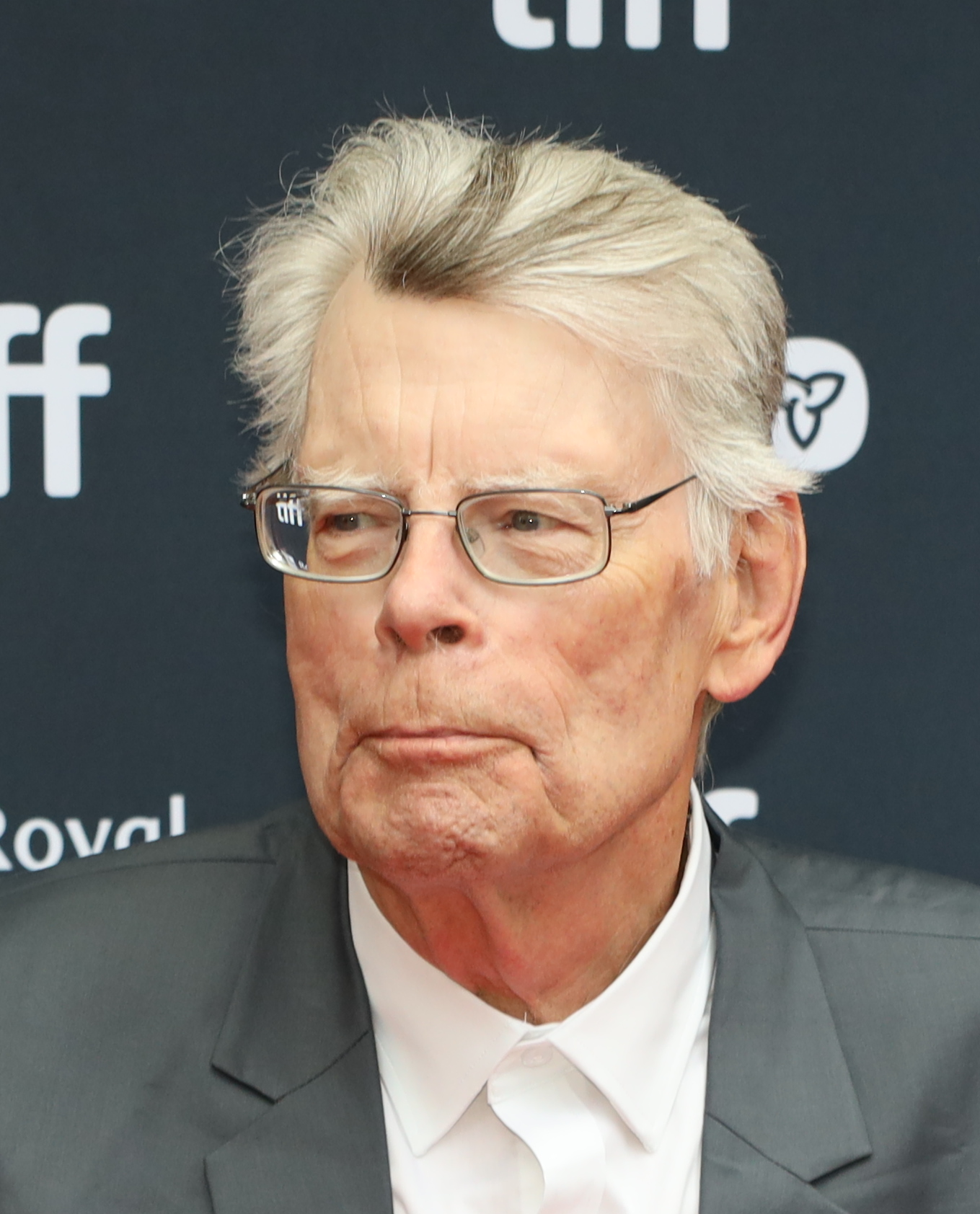
Stephen King

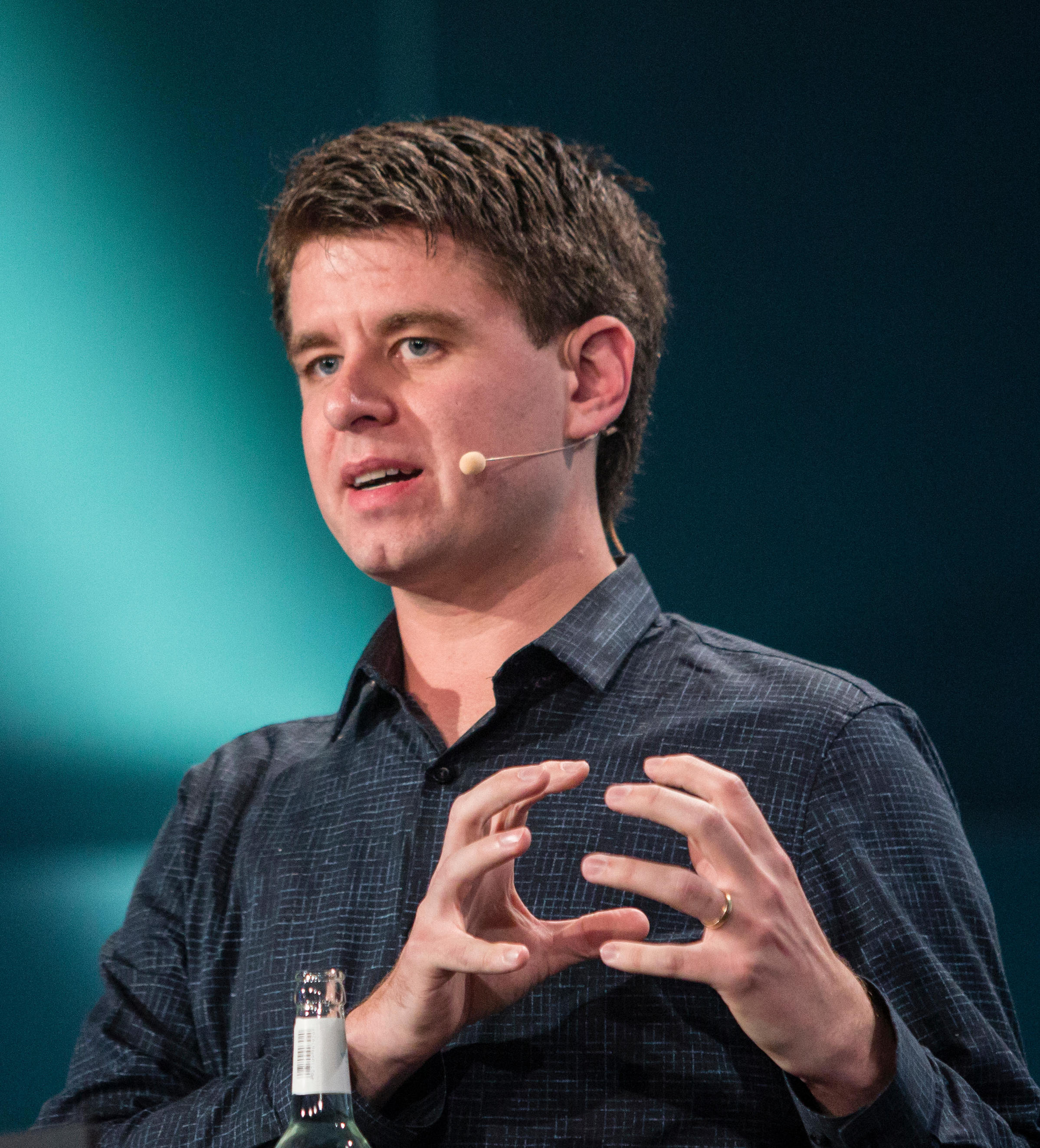
Randall Munroe

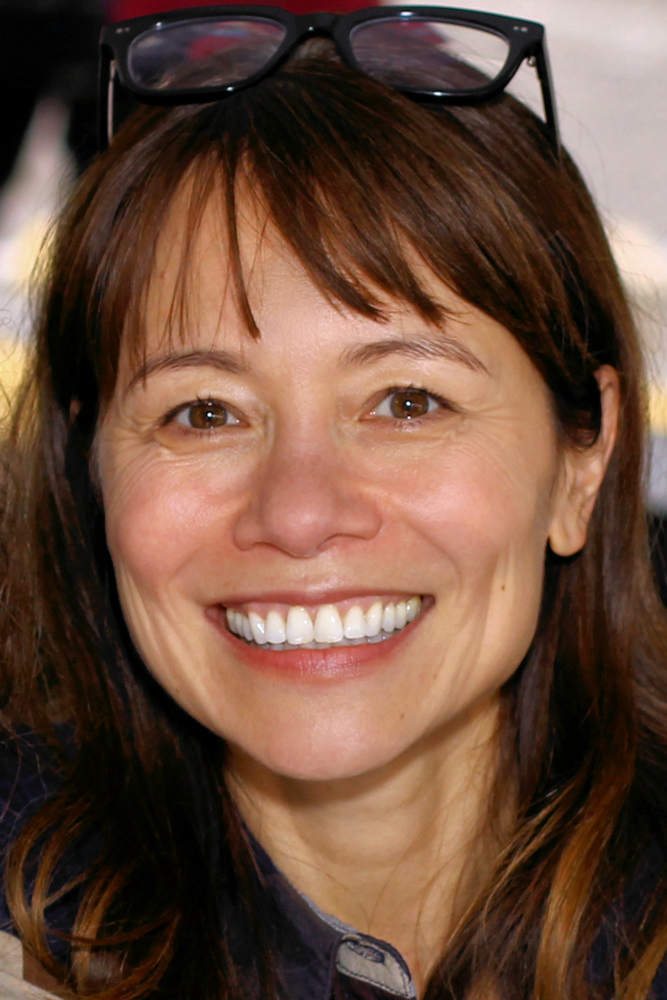
Christina Soontornvat

- Megan Abbott
- Carol J. Adams
- Dahlia Adler
- Becky Albertalli
- William Alexander
- Lauren K. Alleyne
- David Allyn
- Steve Almond
- Kurt Andersen
- Lily Anderson
- M. T. Anderson
- Mary Kay Andrews
- Tom Angleberger
- Jessica Anthony
- Kathi Appelt
- Jennifer Archer
- Sarah Archer
- Elana K. Arnold
- Rilla Askew
- Rick Atkinson
- Nava Atlas
- Margaret Atwood
- Regina Harris Baiocchi
- Kirsten Bakis
- David Baldacci
- Tracey Baptiste
- Kathleen Barber
- Kim Barnes
- Chris Barton
- Elif Batuman
- Richard Bausch
- Jennifer Belle
- Karen Bender
- Elizabeth Benedict
- Helen Benedict
- Laura van den Berg
- Laurence Bergreen
- Erik Scott de Bie
- Kai Bird
- Jeanne Birdsall
- Sven Birkerts
- Holly Black
- Sheila Black
- Jolly Blackburn
- Sarah Blake
- Lucy Jane Bledsoe
- Jenna Blum
- Judy Blume
- S. A. Bodeen
- Gwenda Bond
- Fergus Bordewich
- Marie Brennan
- Martha Brockenbrough
- Suzanne Brockmann
- Sylvia Brownrigg
- Nick Bruel
- Stephanie Burgis
- Alafair Burke
- Jessica Burkhart
- Ian Buruma
- Rachel Kramer Bussel
- Dori Hillestad Butler
- Marcia Butler
- Robert Olen Butler
- Tina Cane
- James Carroll
- June Casagrande
- Christopher Castellani
- Diane Chamberlain
- Justina Chen
- Ron Chernow
- Lee Child
- Wesley Chu
- Cassandra Clare
- Heather Clark
- Breena Clarke
- Meg Waite Clayton
- Jon Clinch
- Lesa Cline-Ransome
- Ta-Nehisi Coates
- Susann Cokal
- Manda Collins
- Martha Collins
- Michael Connelly
- Deborah Copaken
- Kelly Corrigan
- S. A. Cosby
- Nick Courtright
- Nina Crews
- Alice Elliott Dark
- Fiona Davis
- Anita Diamant
- Kate DiCamillo
- Deborah Diesen
- Margaret Dilloway
- Margot Douaihy
- Delphine Dryden
- Andre Dubus III
- Tananarive Due
- Cornelius Eady
- Carol Edgarian
- Kim Edwards
- Dave Eggers
- Louise Erdrich
- Pamela Erens
- Andrew Ervin
- Jonathan Escoffery
- Carrie Etter
- Robert Eversz
- Grant Faulkner
- Jennie Fields
- Molly Fisk
- Janet Fitch
- Sherrie Flick
- Gillian Flynn
- Phil Foglio
- Matt Forbeck
- Gayle Forman
- Connie May Fowler
- Karen Joy Fowler
- Therese Fowler
- Colleen Frakes
- Caroline Fraser
- Lisa Rowe Fraustino
- Marla Frazee
- Nora Fussner
- Michelle Gable
- Cristina García
- Whitney Gardner
- Bonnie Garmus
- Elizabeth George
- Gary Giddins
- Lamar Giles
- Ethan Gilsdorf
- Alex Gino
- Max Gladstone
- Julia Glass
- Robin Preiss Glasser
- Glen David Gold
- Michael Golden
- Amanda Gorman
- Gavin Grant
- Alan Gratz
- Elizabeth Graver
- Adele Griffin
- Nikki Grimes
- Carol Guess
- Jennifer Haigh
- Rachel Howzell Hall
- Aaron Hamburger
- Nigel Hamilton
- Elizabeth Hand
- Daniel Handler (Lemony Snicket)
- Gabrielle Harbowy
- Adrianne Harun
- Rachel Hawkins
- Kevin Hearne
- Deborah Heiligman
- Elin Hilderbrand
- Van Hoang
- Adam Hochschild
- Elizabeth Holmes
- A. M. Homes
- Ann Hood
- Michelle Hoover
- Ellen Hopkins
- Silas House
- Pam Houston
- Katherine Howe
- Molly Idle
- Jessica James
- Gish Jen
- Kij Johnson
- Amanda Johnston
- Patricia Spears Jones
- Alka Joshi
- Elise Juska
- Daphne Kalotay
- Lydia Kang
- Hester Kaplan
- Mary Karr
- Lynne Kelly
- Steve Kenson
- Beth Kephart
- John Kessel
- Pauli Kidd
- Sue Monk Kidd
- Lily King
- Stephen King
- Barbara Kingsolver
- Katrina Kittle
- Christina Baker Kline
- Jean Hanff Korelitz
- John Kovalic
- Nicola Kraus
- Ken Krimstein
- Uma Krishnaswami
- Gary Krist
- Scott Kurtz
- Ellen Kushner
- Kevin Kwan
- Nina LaCour
- Laura Lam
- Anne Lamott
- Dorianne Laux
- Michael Leali
- Linda Leavell
- Caroline Leavitt
- Mackenzi Lee
- Marie Lee
- Min Jin Lee
- Kristen Lepionka
- Elizabeth Letts
- David Levithan
- Grace Lin
- Marissa Lingen
- Kelly Link
- Elinor Lipman
- Margot Livesey
- E. Lockhart
- Alex London
- M.G. Lord
- Jess Lourey
- Michael Lowenthal
- Catherine Lundoff
- Kelly Starling Lyons
- David Alan Mack
- Sarah MacLean
- Clarence Major
- Rebecca Makkai
- Fran Manushkin
- Meredith Maran
- Jeff Mariotte
- Ari Marmell
- Megan Marshall
- Jacqueline Briggs Martin
- William Martin
- Arkady Martine
- Donna Masini
- Sujata Massey
- Francine Mathews
- Suzanne Matson
- Alice Mattison
- Courtney Maum
- James McBride
- Stephen McCauley
- Jill McCorkle
- Sarah McCoy
- Joy McCullough
- Kelly McCullough
- Alice McDermott
- Lisa McMann
- Karen M. McManus
- Edie Meidav
- Askold Melnyczuk
- Brad Meltzer
- Stephen Messer
- Randy Susan Meyers
- Candice Millard
- Chanel Miller
- Sue Miller
- Tyler Mills
- Susan Minot
- Rick Moody
- Walter Mosley
- Randall Munroe
- E. C. Myers
- Celeste Ng
- Milton J. Nieuwsma
- Jennifer Niven
- Katia Noyes
- Joyce Carol Oates
- Kevin O'Brien
- Ellen Oh
- Daniel Okrent
- Barbara O'Neal
- Ruth Ozeki
- Anne Marie Pace
- Ann Packer
- Sara Paretsky
- Carolyn Parkhurst
- Ann Patchett
- Ridley Pearson
- Tom Perrotta
- Jayne Anne Phillips
- Jodi Picoult
- Donald Platt
- Katha Pollitt
- Margi Preus
- Melissa Pritchard
- Jamie Quatro
- Kate Racculia
- Joanna Rakoff
- Rishi Reddi
- Victoria Redel
- Beth Revis
- Anica Mrose Rissi
- Roxana Robinson
- M. J. Rose
- Robert Rosen
- Elizabeth Rosner
- Eric Rosswood
- Kaira Rouda
- Laura Ruby
- Richard Russo
- Riley Sager
- Lilith Saintcrow
- Marisa de los Santos
- A. J. Sass
- George Saunders
- Valerie Sayers
- Elizabeth Garton Scanlon
- Steven Schend
- Stacy Schiff
- Elizabeth Searle
- Alex Segura
- Adam Selzer
- Brian Selznick
- Barbara Shapiro
- Dani Shapiro
- Jessica Shattuck
- Suzanne Strempek Shea
- Russell Shorto
- Laura Shovan
- Alix Kates Shulman
- Joan Silber
- Elizabeth L. Silver
- Adam Silvera
- Anita Silvey
- Janni Lee Simner
- Gail Simone
- Helen Simonson
- Dana Simpson
- Curtis Sittenfeld
- Jennifer E. Smith
- Kristine Smith
- Patricia Smith
- Laurel Snyder
- Christina Soontornvat
- Debra Spark
- Scott Spencer
- Dana Spiotta
- Donna Baier Stein
- Amanda Stern
- Cheryl Strayed
- Ellen Sussman
- Terese Svoboda
- Julia E. Sweig
- Lalita Tademy
- Jeff Tamarkin
- Amy Tan
- Judith Tarr
- Chris Tebbetts
- Kara Thomas
- Judith Thurman
- Jessica Treadway
- Paul G. Tremblay
- Trudi Trueit
- Gail Tsukiyama
- Scott Turow
- Luis Alberto Urrea
- Anne Ursu
- Amanda Vaill
- Katherine Vaz
- Bev Vincent
- Ginger Wadsworth
- Lois Walden
- Ayelet Waldman
- Melissa Walker
- Andrea Wang
- Geoffrey C. Ward
- Harriet A. Washington
- Renée Watson
- April Halprin Wayland
- Carole Boston Weatherford
- David Heska Wanbli Weiden
- Jennifer Weiner
- Martha Wells
- Chuck Wendig
- Jacqueline West
- Tara Westover
- Ellen Emerson White
- Susan Wiggs
- Alicia D. Williams
- Hilma Wolitzer
- Meg Wolitzer
- Julie Wu
- Emanuel Xavier
- Jeff Yang
- Steve Yarbrough
- Rafael Yglesias
- Jane Yolen
- Mako Yoshikawa
- Paul O. Zelinsky
- Jeff Zentner
- Gabrielle Zevin
- Jennifer Ziegler
- Laura Zigman
- Mary Kay Zuravleff

== Sports figures ==
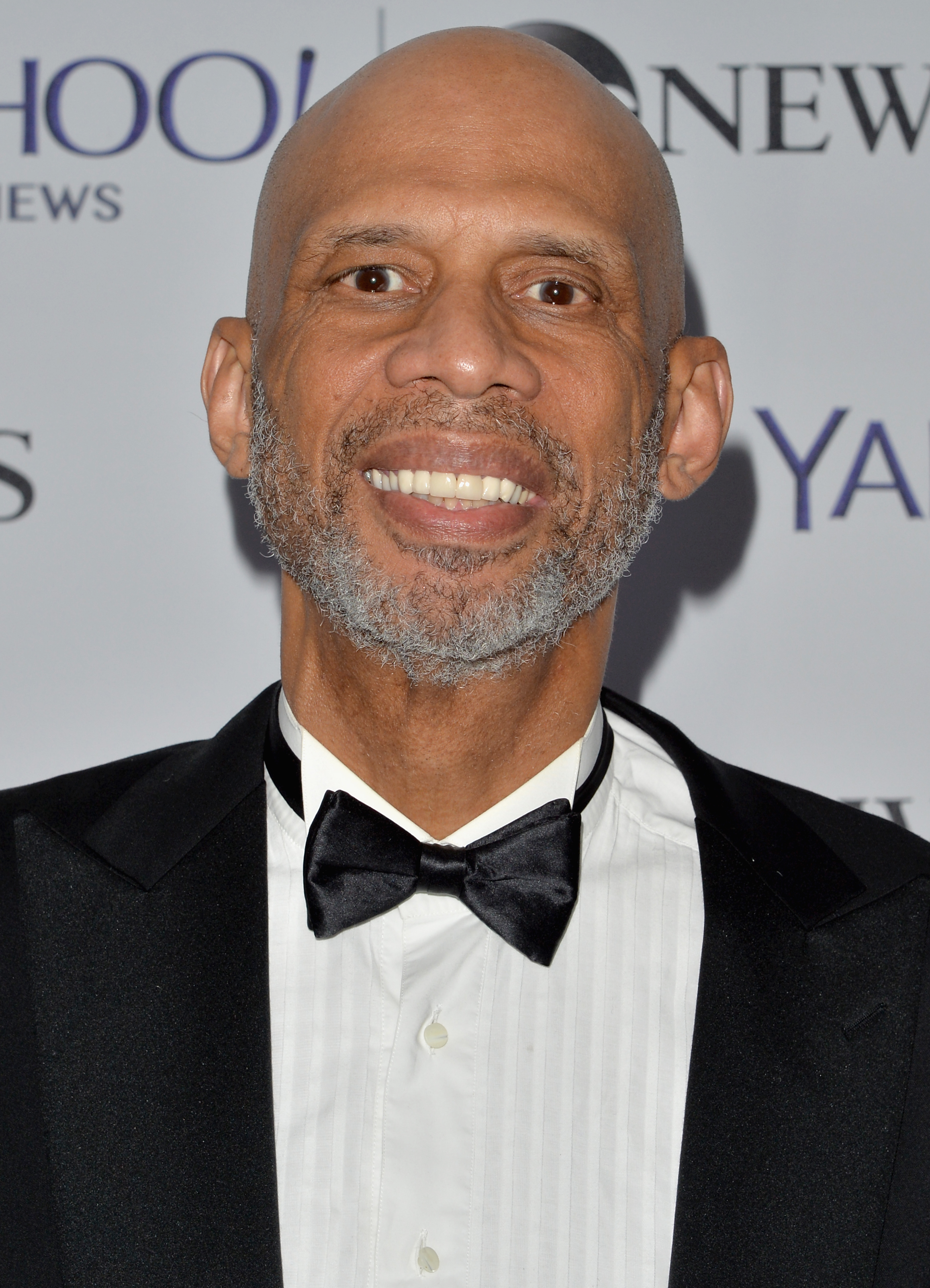
Kareem Abdul-Jabbar

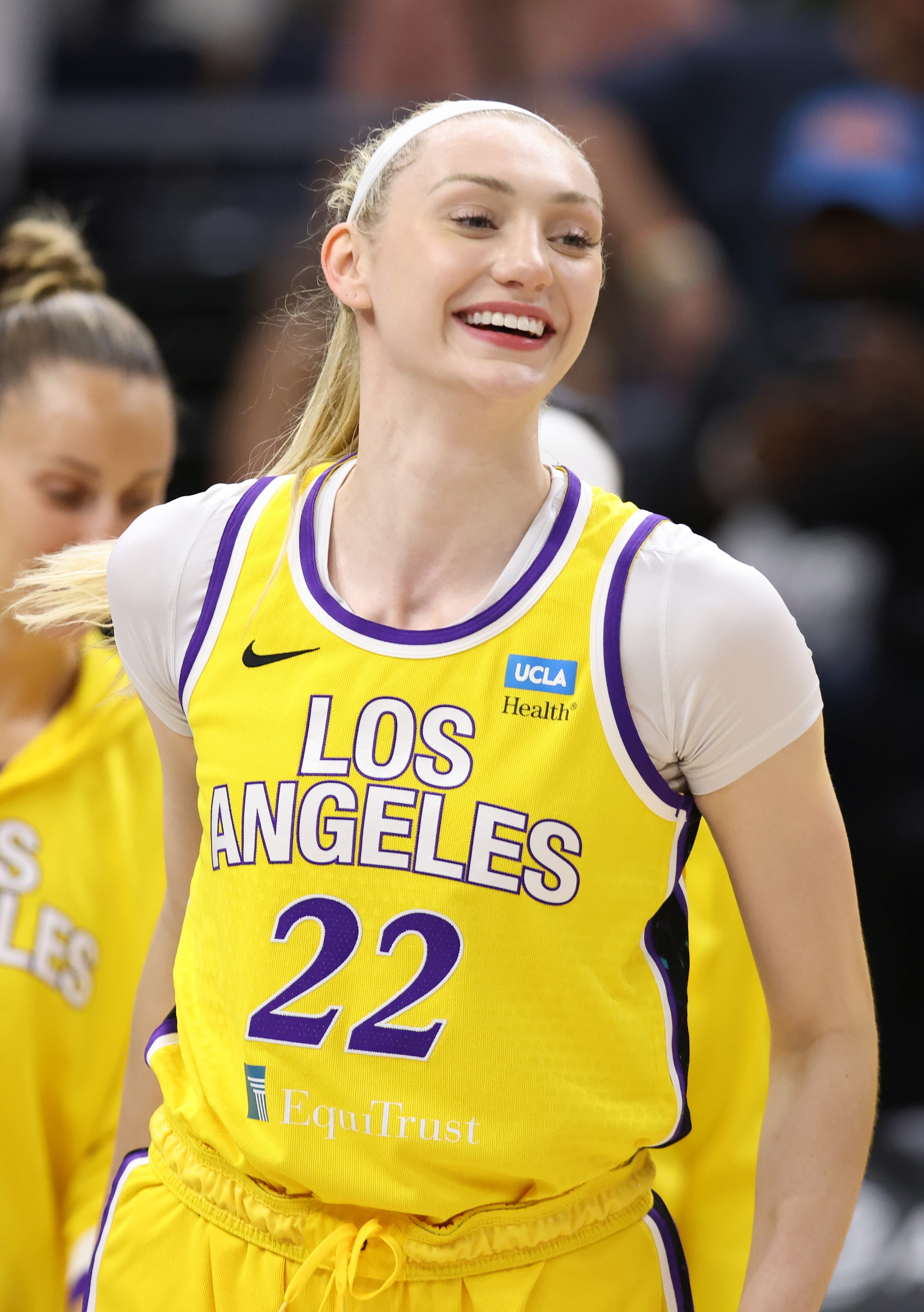
Cameron Brink

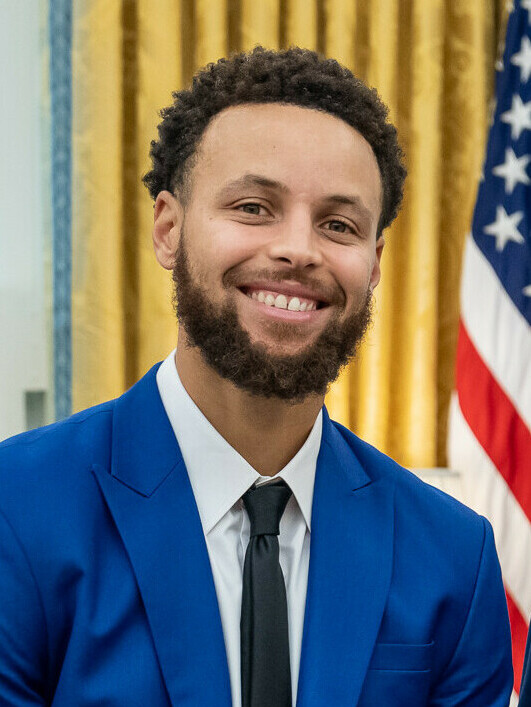
Stephen Curry

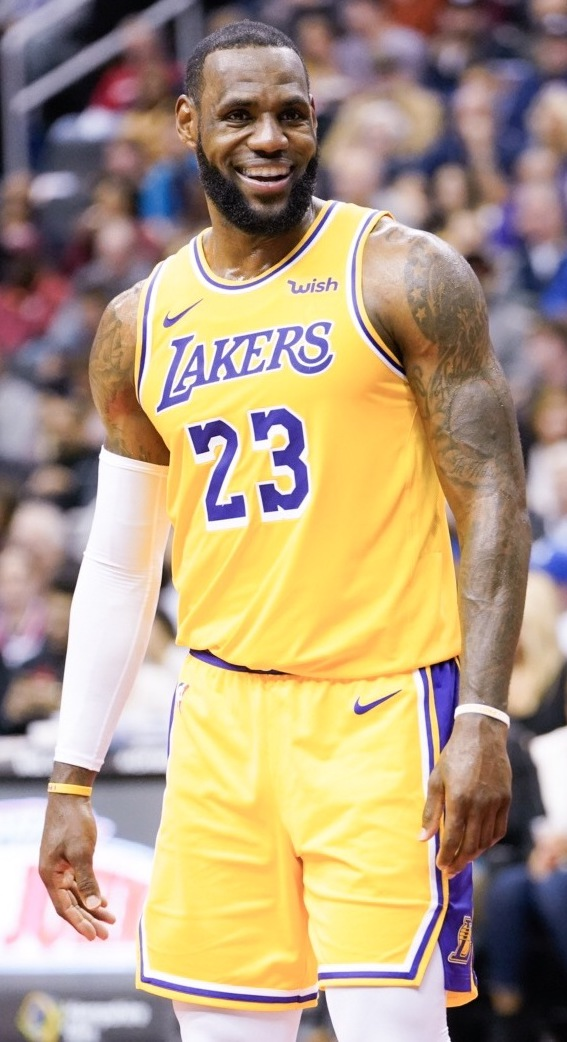
LeBron James

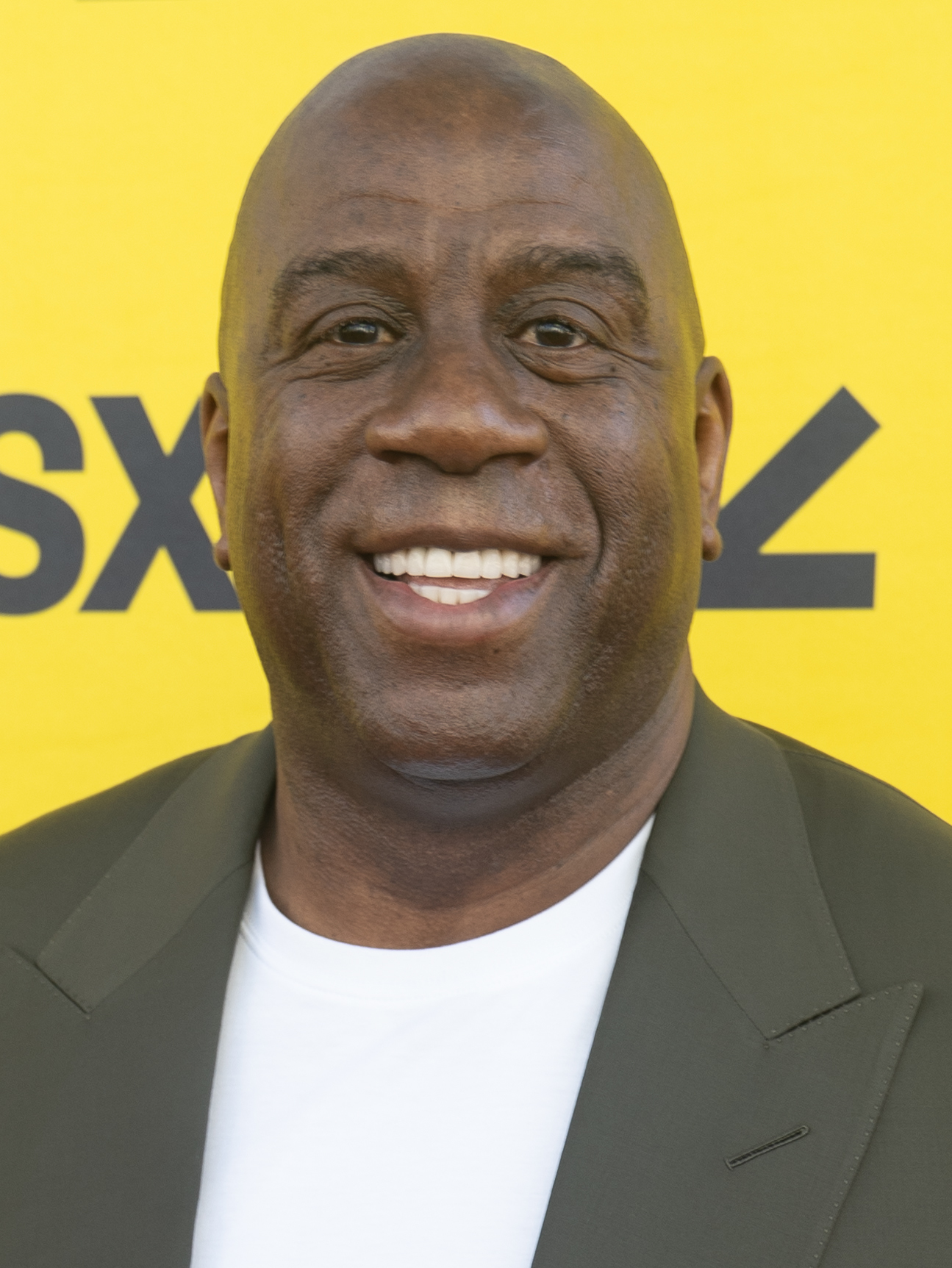
Magic Johnson

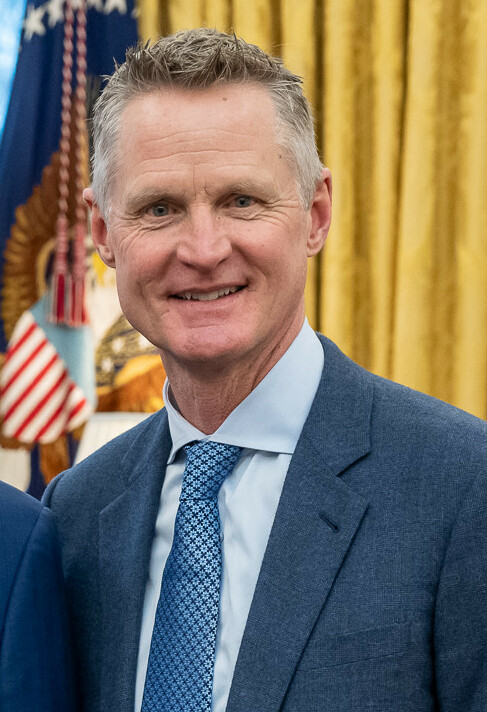
Steve Kerr

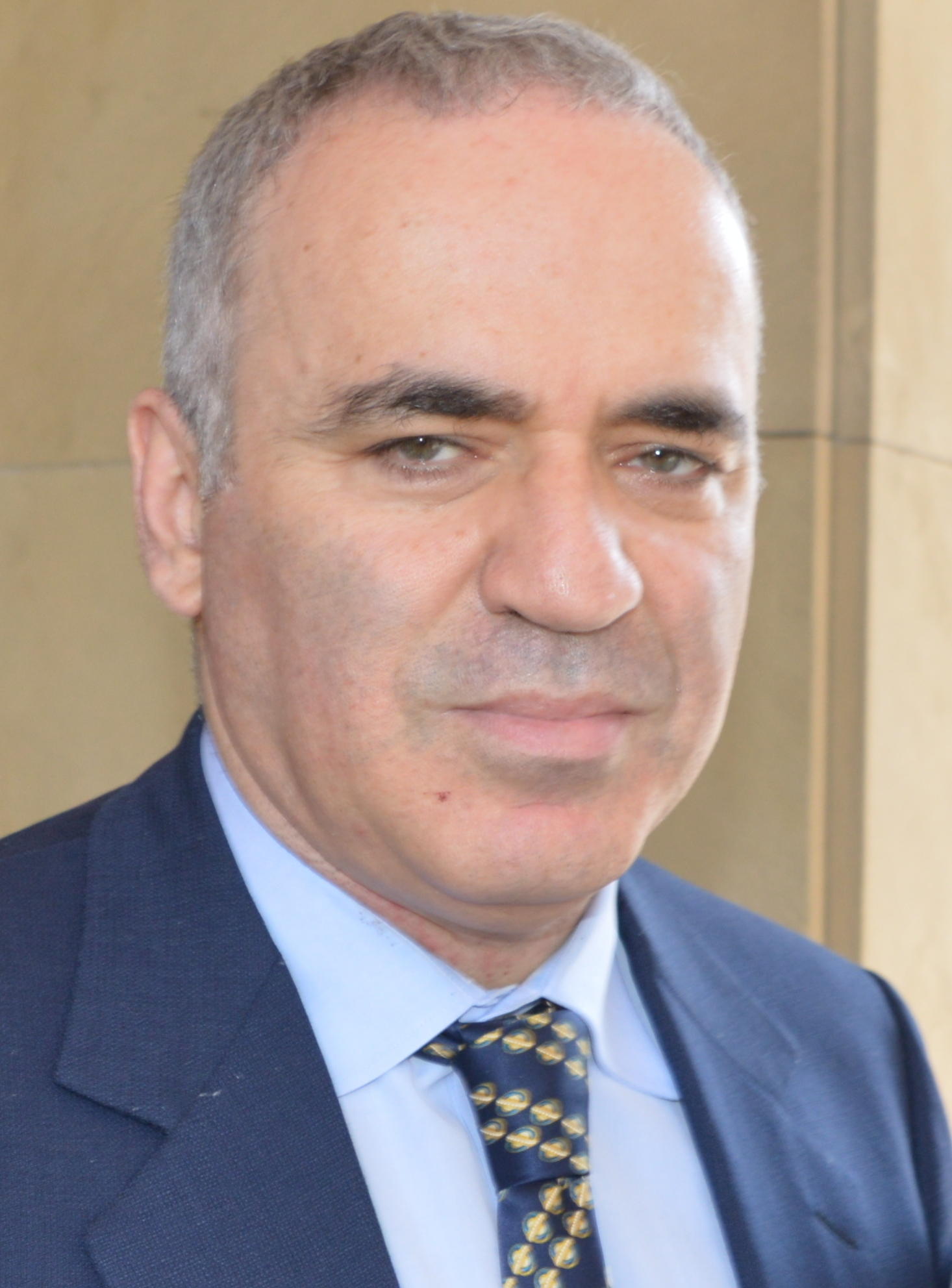
Garry Kasparov

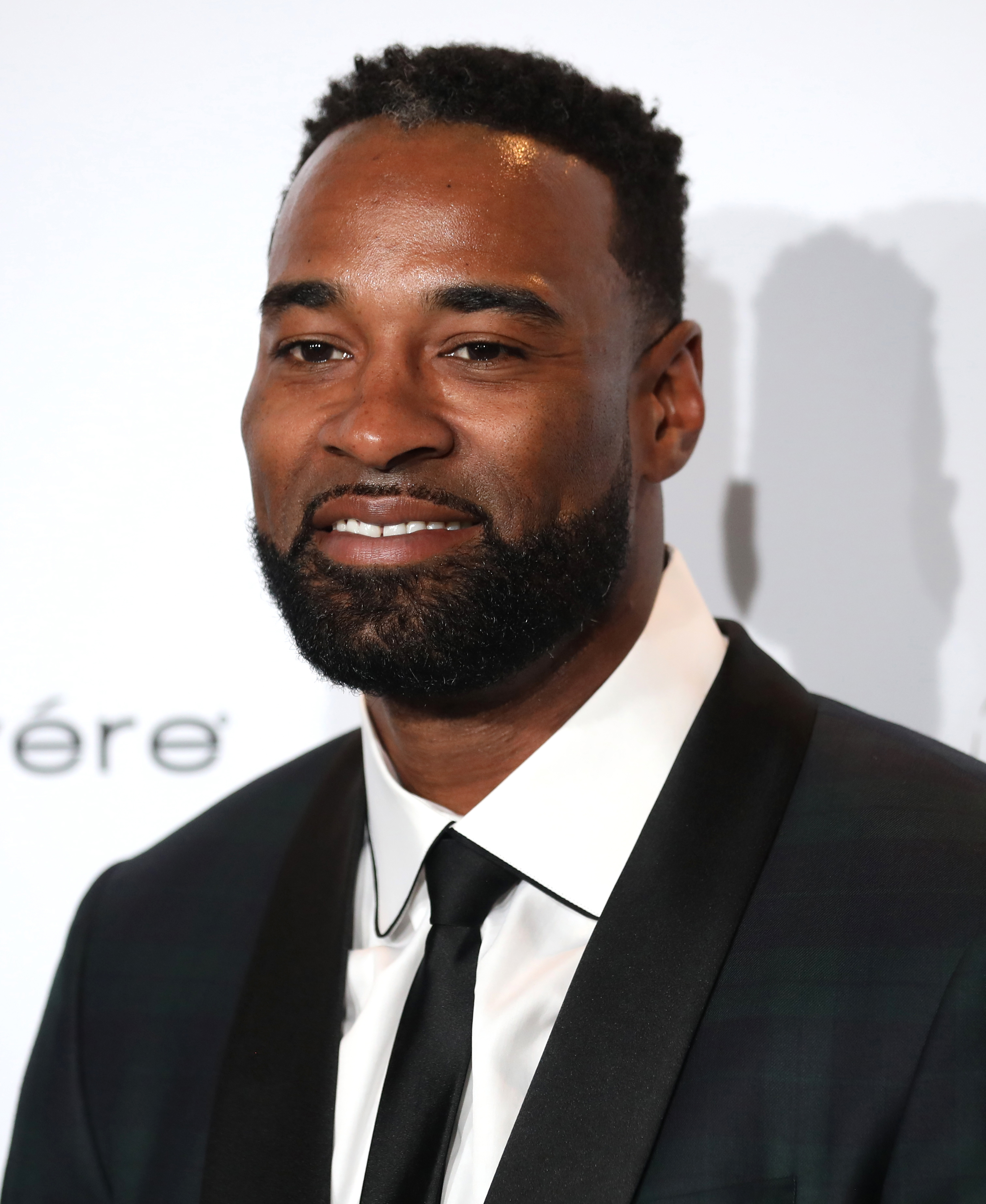
Calvin Johnson

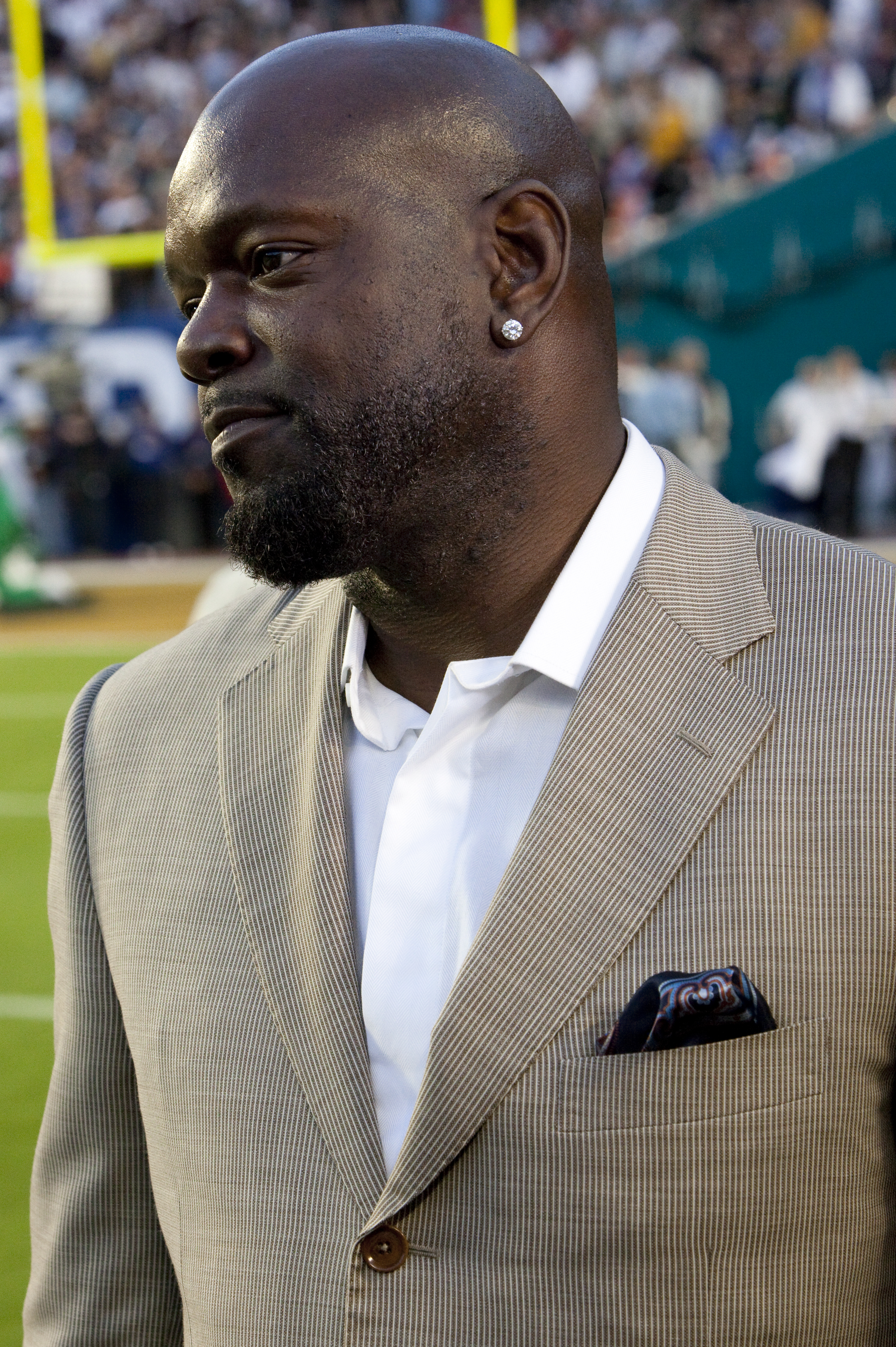
Emmitt Smith

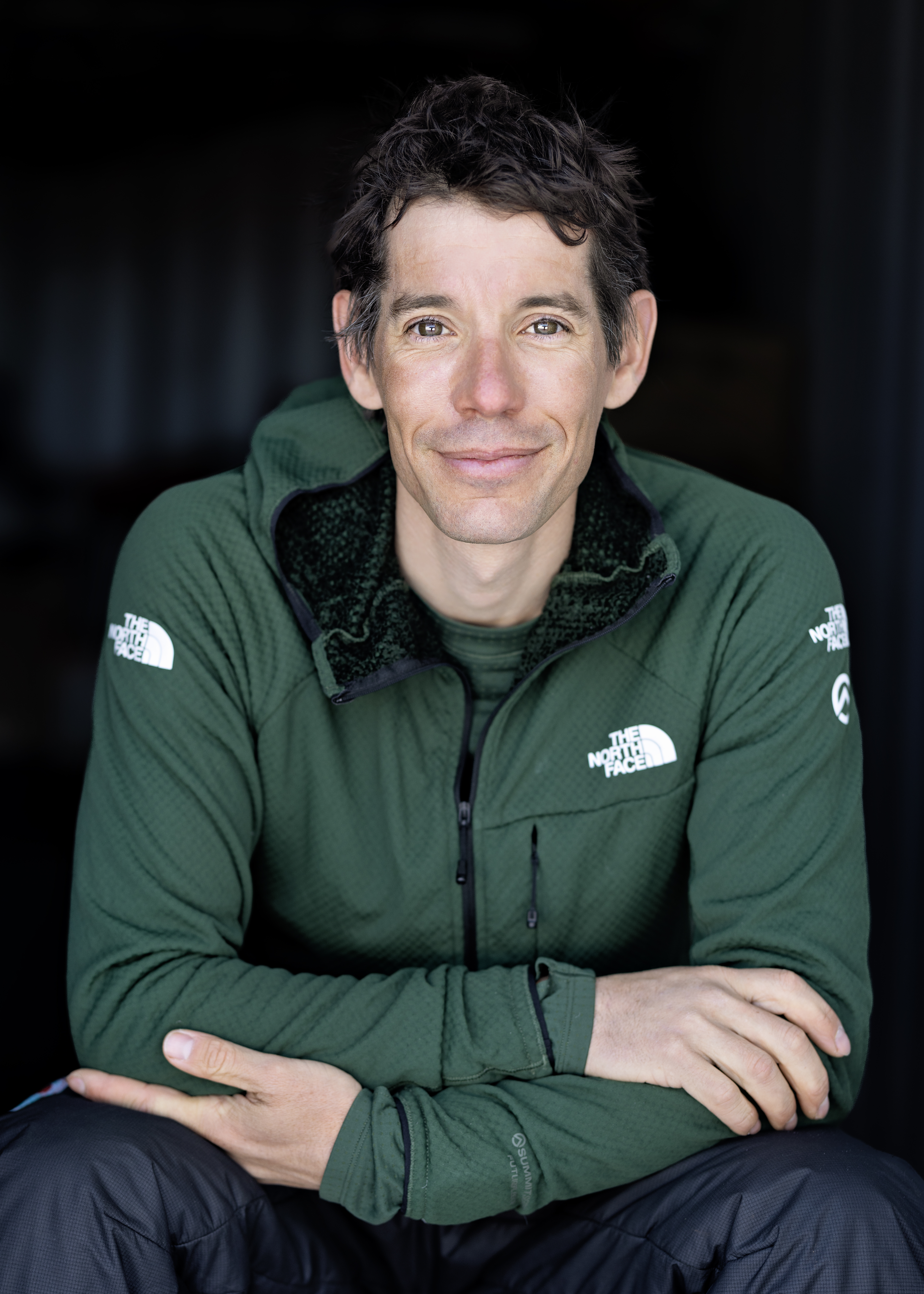
Alex Honnold

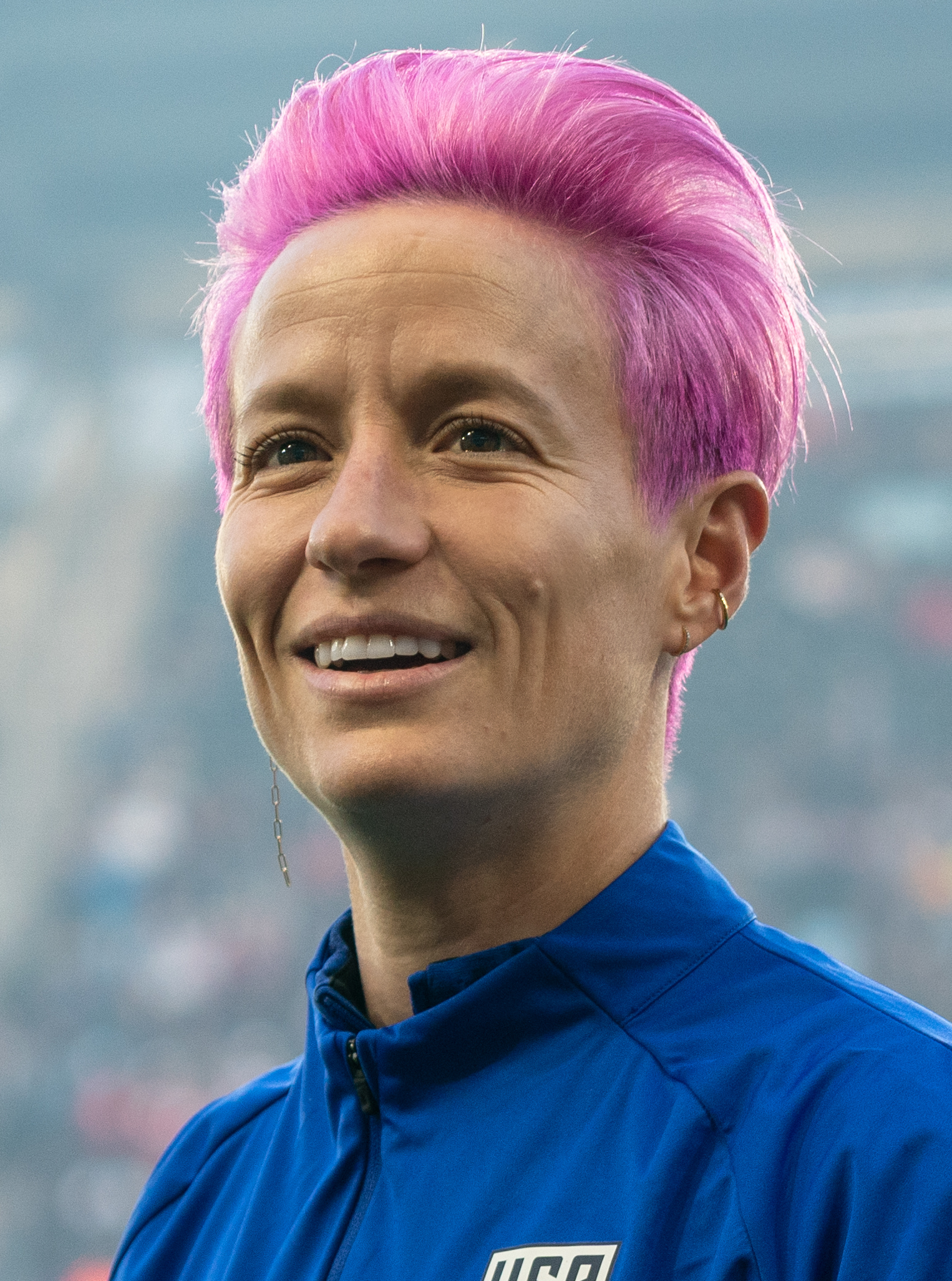
Megan Rapinoe

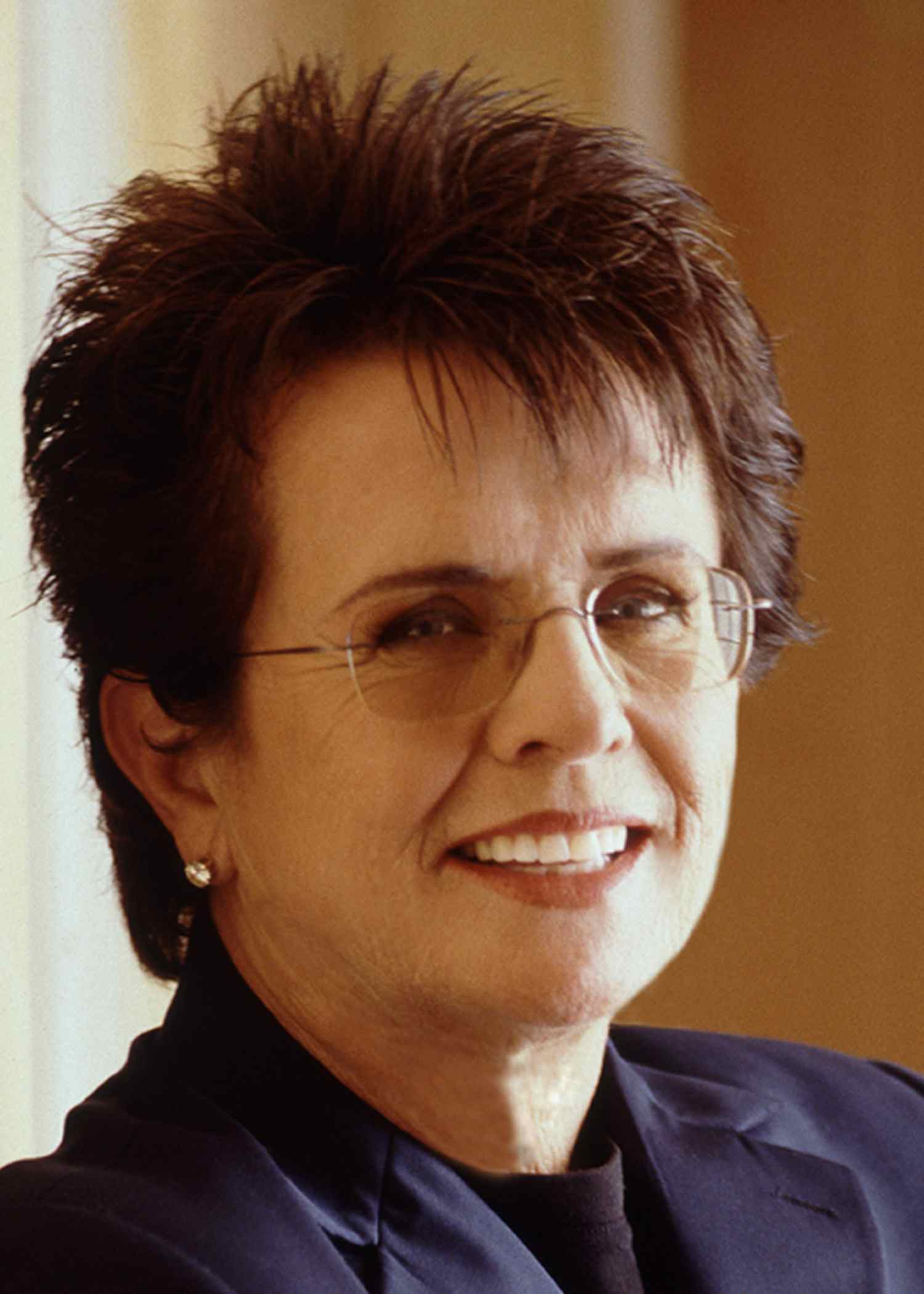
Billie Jean King

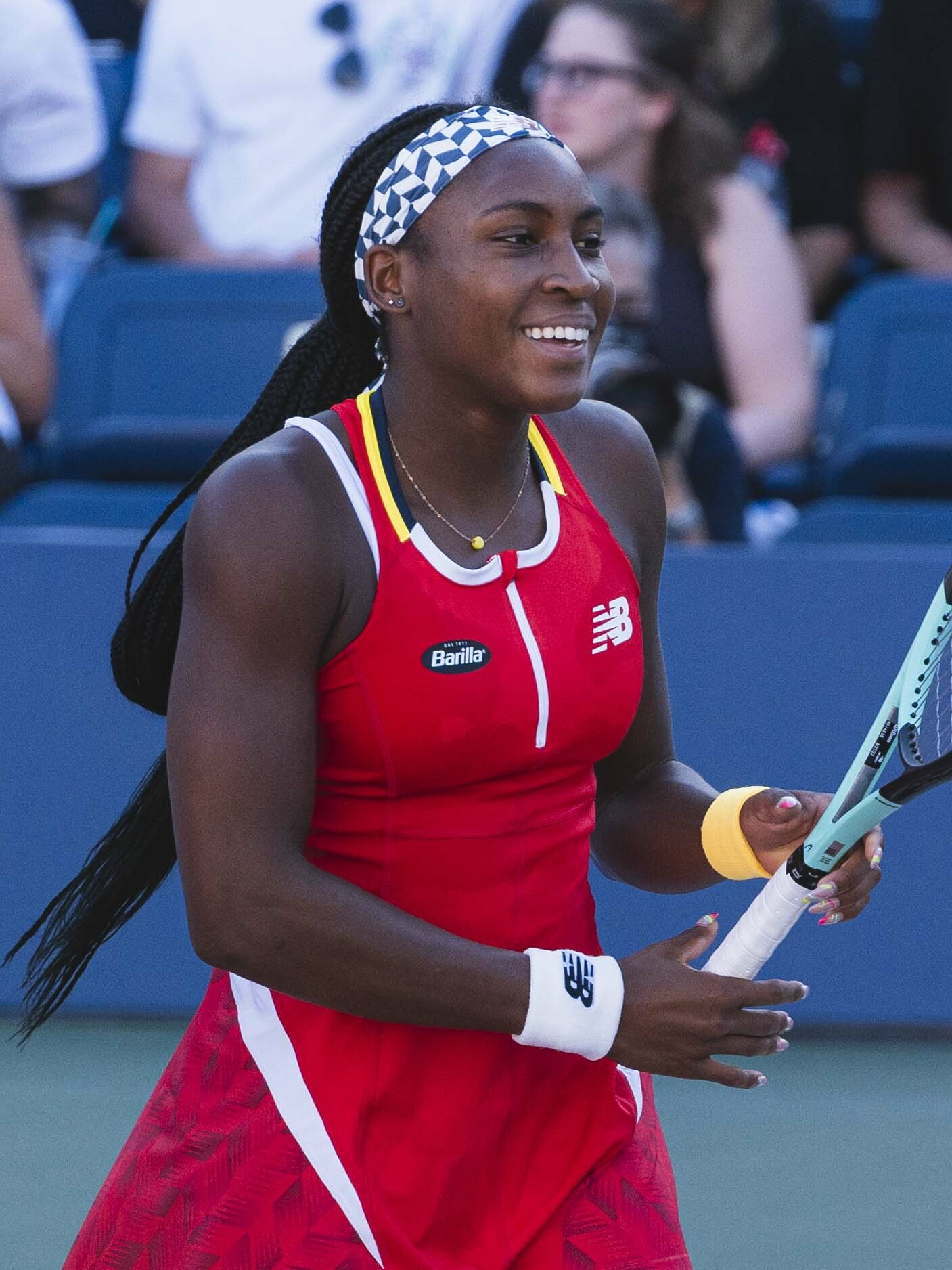
Coco Gauff

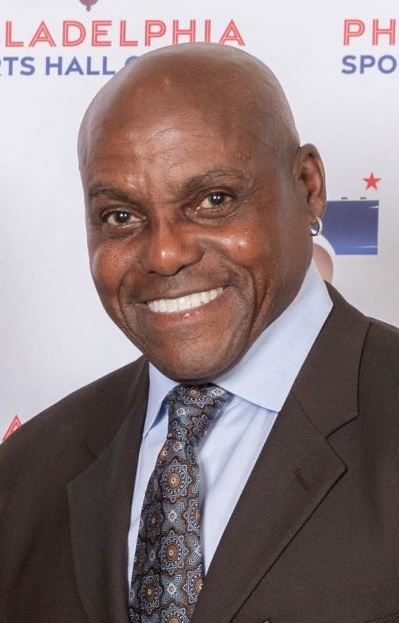
Carl Lewis

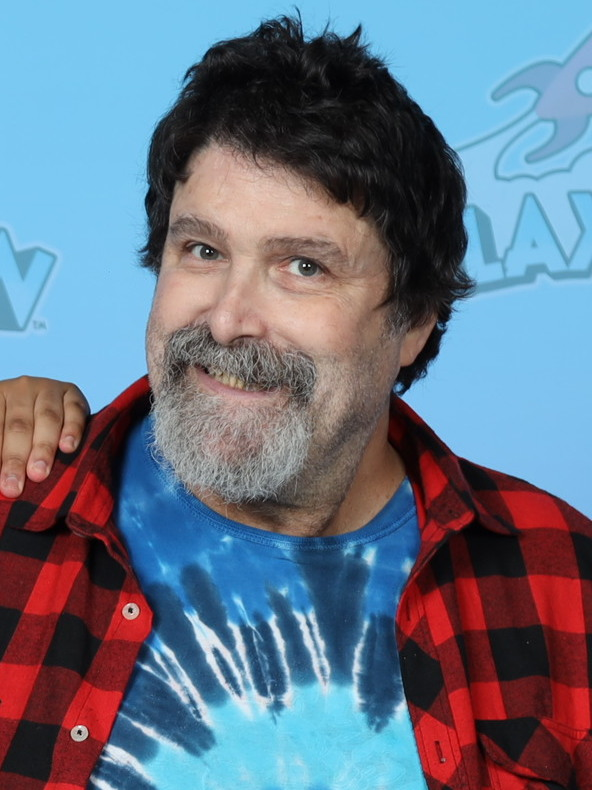
Mick Foley

=== Baseball ===
- Adrián González

=== Basketball ===
- Kareem Abdul-Jabbar
- Charles Barkley (Independent)
- Matt Barnes
- Sue Bird
- Jim Bostic
- Cameron Brink
- Kennedy Burke
- Rex Chapman
- Natasha Cloud
- Stephen Curry
- Larry Drew II
- Len Elmore
- Draymond Green
- Brittney Griner
- Lindsey Harding
- Jaren Jackson Jr.
- LeBron James
- Eddie Johnson
- Magic Johnson
- George Karl
- Steve Kerr
- Betnijah Laney-Hamilton
- Crystal Langhorne
- CJ McCollum
- Muffet McGraw
- Khris Middleton
- Norm Nixon
- Candace Parker
- Chris Paul
- Terry Porter
- Cheryl Reeve
- Doc Rivers
- Metta Sandiford-Artest
- Breanna Stewart
- Dawn Staley
- Diana Taurasi
- Courtney Vandersloot
- Lenny Wilkens
- Gabby Williams
- A'ja Wilson

=== Chess ===
- Garry Kasparov
- Jennifer Shahade

=== Diving ===
- Greg Louganis

=== Football ===
- Joe Adams
- Will Allen
- Willard Bailey
- Antoine Bethea
- Elvin Bethea
- Jerome Bettis
- Mel Blount
- Thomas Booker
- Emerson Boozer
- Robert Brazile
- Waymond Bryant
- Harold Carmichael
- Harry Carson
- Raymond Chester
- Ben Coates
- Greg Coleman
- Thomas Davis Sr.
- Kevin Dent
- Richard Dent
- Parnell Dickinson
- Donald Driver
- Leslie Frazier
- Jimmie Giles
- Joe Greene
- James "Shack" Harris
- Bill Hayes
- Mike Haynes
- Thomas Henderson
- Ken Houston
- Richard Huntley
- Harold Jackson
- Rich Jackson
- Willie Jeffries
- Billy Joe
- Calvin Johnson
- Ed "Too Tall" Jones
- Willie Lanier
- Henry Lawrence
- Marv Levy
- Albert Lewis
- Frank Lewis
- Jim Marsalis
- Matt McGloin
- Ron Mix
- Carl Nassib
- Timmy Newsome
- Nate Newton
- Lemar Parrish
- Drew Pearson
- Robert Porcher
- John Randle
- Pete Richardson
- Willie Roaf
- Art Shell
- Donnie Shell
- Jackie Slater
- Torrance Small
- Emmitt Smith
- Charles Snowden
- Jan Stenerud
- Joe Taylor
- Dennis Thomas
- Andre Tippett
- Willie Totten
- Everson Walls
- John Walton
- Sammy White
- Doug Williams
- Erik Williams
- Kellen Winslow
- Roynell Young

=== Hockey ===
- Dominik Hašek

=== Mixed martial arts ===
- Chris Curtis
- Mike Jackson

=== Rock climbing ===
- Conrad Anker
- Alex Honnold
- Timmy O'Neill
- Renan Öztürk

=== Rugby ===
- Ilona Maher

=== Soccer ===
- Tesho Akindele
- Ashlyn Harris
- Ali Krieger
- Alex Morgan
- Megan Rapinoe
- Abby Wambach
- Caroline Weir

=== Swimming ===
- Casey Legler
- Alexandra Truwit

=== Tennis ===
- Ayan Broomfield
- Coco Gauff
- Billie Jean King
- Martina Navratilova
- Andy Roddick
- Pam Shriver
- Rennae Stubbs

=== Track and field ===
- Carl Lewis

=== Wrestling ===
- Jim Cornette
- Mick Foley
- A. J. Francis
- Tiger Mask IV
- Kevin Nash

== See also ==
- List of Donald Trump 2024 presidential campaign non-political endorsements
- List of Kamala Harris 2024 presidential campaign political endorsements
