= 2024 Republican Party vice presidential candidate selection =

2024 Republican vice presidential nomination
- July 15, 2024
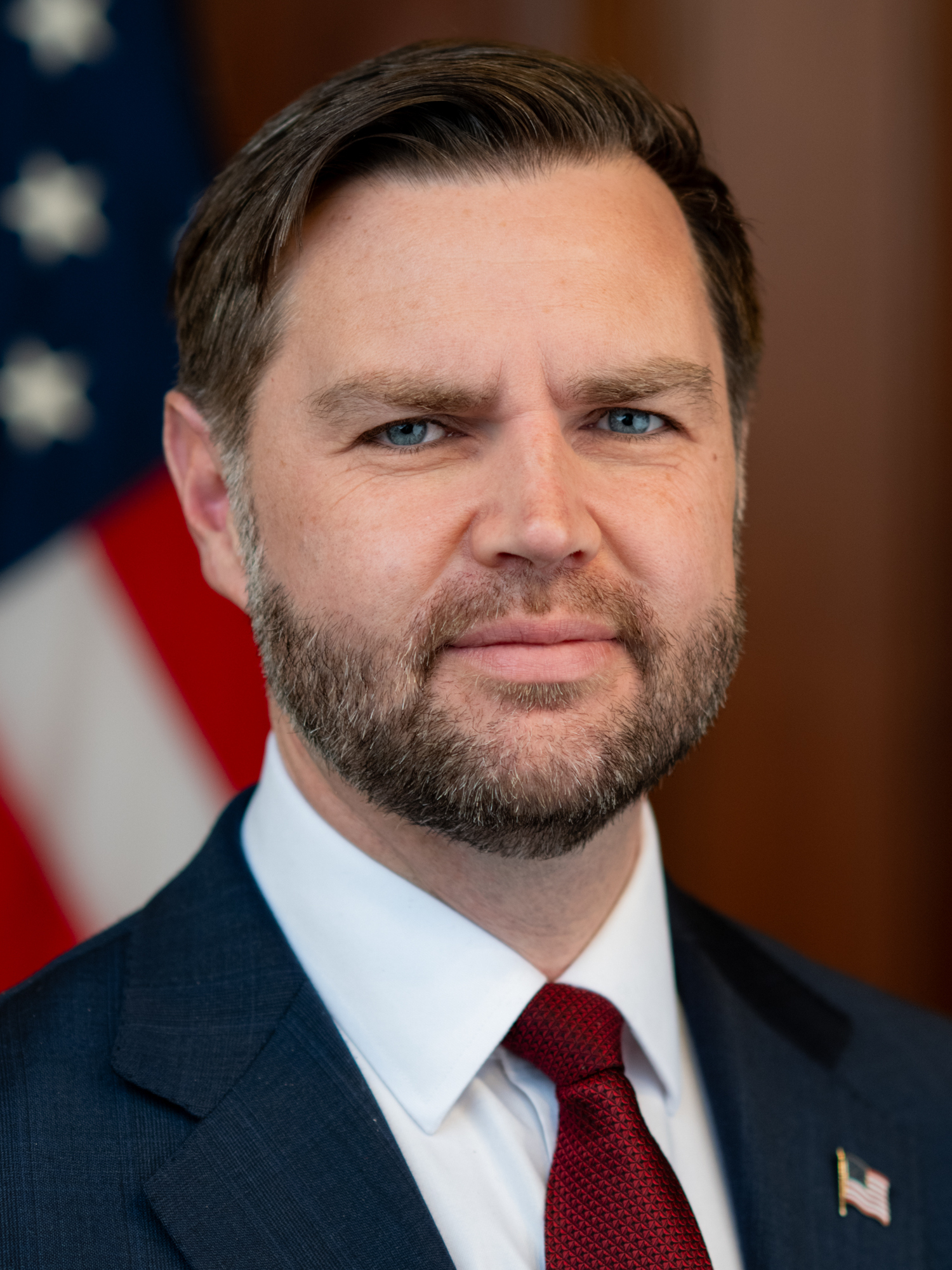
| Nominee | JD Vance |
| Home state | Ohio |
Previous Vice Presidential nominee
Mike Pence
Vice Presidential nominee
JD Vance

Former president Donald Trump, the 2024 Republican nominee for president of the United States, considered several prominent Republicans and other individuals before selecting Senator JD Vance of Ohio as his candidate for Vice President of the United States on July 15, 2024, the first day of the 2024 Republican National Convention. At age 39, Vance formally won the vice presidential nomination. The Trump–Vance ticket defeated the Harris–Walz ticket in the 2024 presidential election. Vance became the youngest person elected vice president since Richard Nixon in 1952 at 40 years old.

Vance is the first Ohioan to appear on a major party presidential ticket since John Bricker in 1944, the first Ohio native to be elected to the vice presidency since Charles Dawes in 1924, and the first veteran since Al Gore in 1992. He was also the first Millennial, U.S. Marine Corps veteran, and veteran of the Iraq War and the wider war on terror on a presidential ticket, as well as to be elected to the vice presidency, whereas his wife Usha Vance, (née) Chilukuri became the youngest second lady since Jane Hadley Barkley in 1949, and the first Asian American second lady.

== Background ==
In March 2022, former president Donald Trump announced that he would not select his former vice president, Mike Pence, as his running mate in 2024.

Trump's anticipated status as the presumptive nominee was solidified upon his victories in the Super Tuesday primaries, which saw Nikki Haley, his last remaining opposition, drop out the following day. Haley refused to endorse Trump at the time, leaving her out of consideration in the view of multiple news and media outlets. Trump became the presumptive nominee on March 12.

Under the Twelfth Amendment to the United States Constitution, members of the Electoral College cannot vote for both a presidential and a vice presidential candidate who are from the same state as themselves, to prevent states from picking a favorite son. As Trump currently resides in Florida, the state's electors could not vote for both Trump and his running mate if the running mate also resided in Florida. In 2000, when Texas Governor George W. Bush picked Dick Cheney, who also lived in Texas, Cheney changed his voter registration to Wyoming (where he represented the state in the House of Representatives in the 1980s) to prevent this issue from arising with Texas' critical electoral votes.

== Vetting process and selection ==
By June 2024, a shortlist of nine candidates emerged. Four of the candidates (Doug Burgum, Marco Rubio, Tim Scott and JD Vance) were reportedly sent "vetting materials" (although Rubio himself has denied this), while the Trump campaign requested information from four others (Ben Carson, Tom Cotton, Byron Donalds, and Elise Stefanik). On June 13, 2024, Trump indicated that Glenn Youngkin was also on his shortlist.

=== Finalists ===
On June 21, NBC News reported the three finalists were Burgum, Rubio and Vance. Burgum and Vance were said to be Trump's main focus in his running mate search, while complications were noted in Rubio as a choice due to his residency in Florida. CNN also projected that Scott was the fourth finalist to be Trump's running mate.

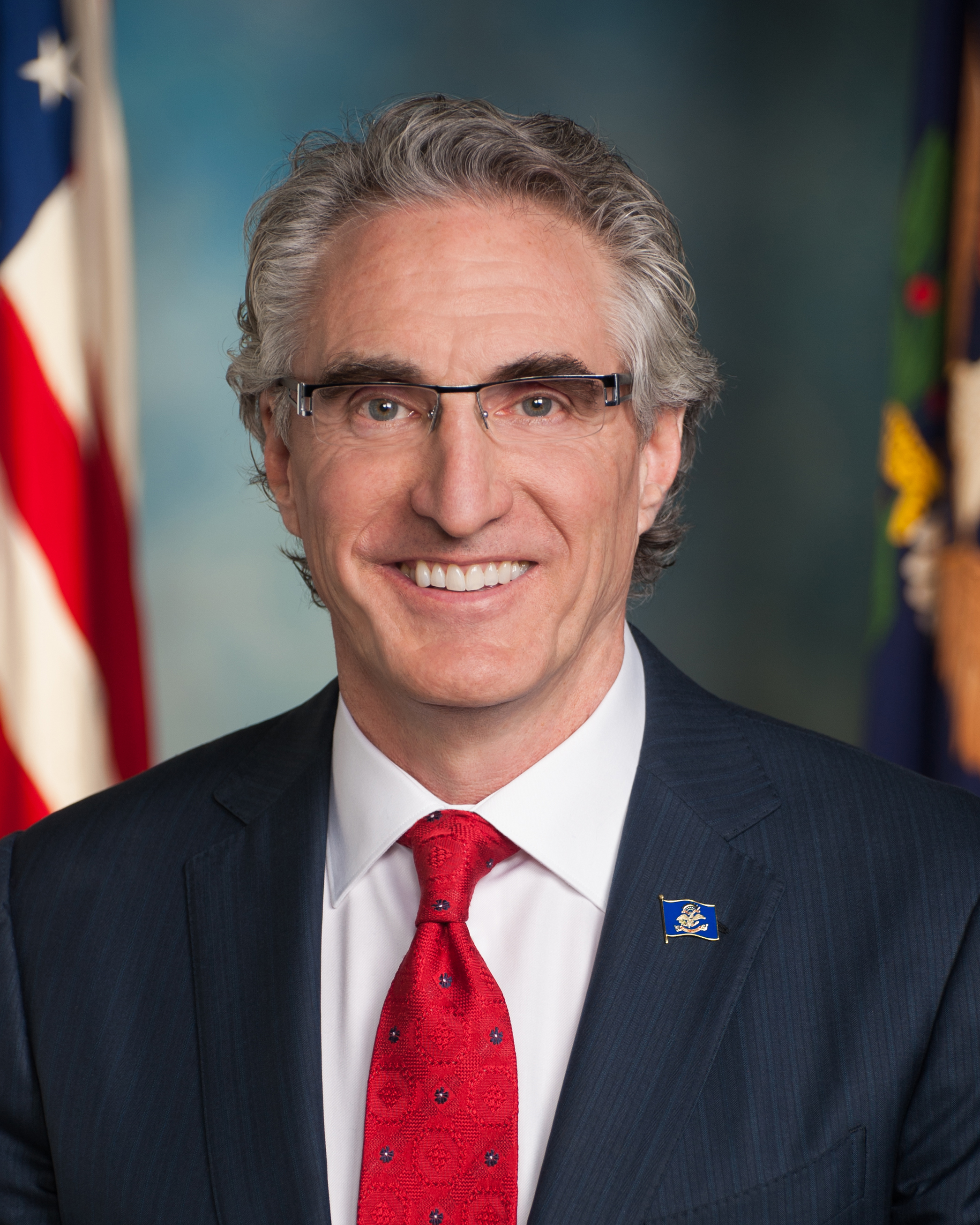
Governor and 2024 presidential candidate
Doug Burgum
of North Dakota
(2016–2024)

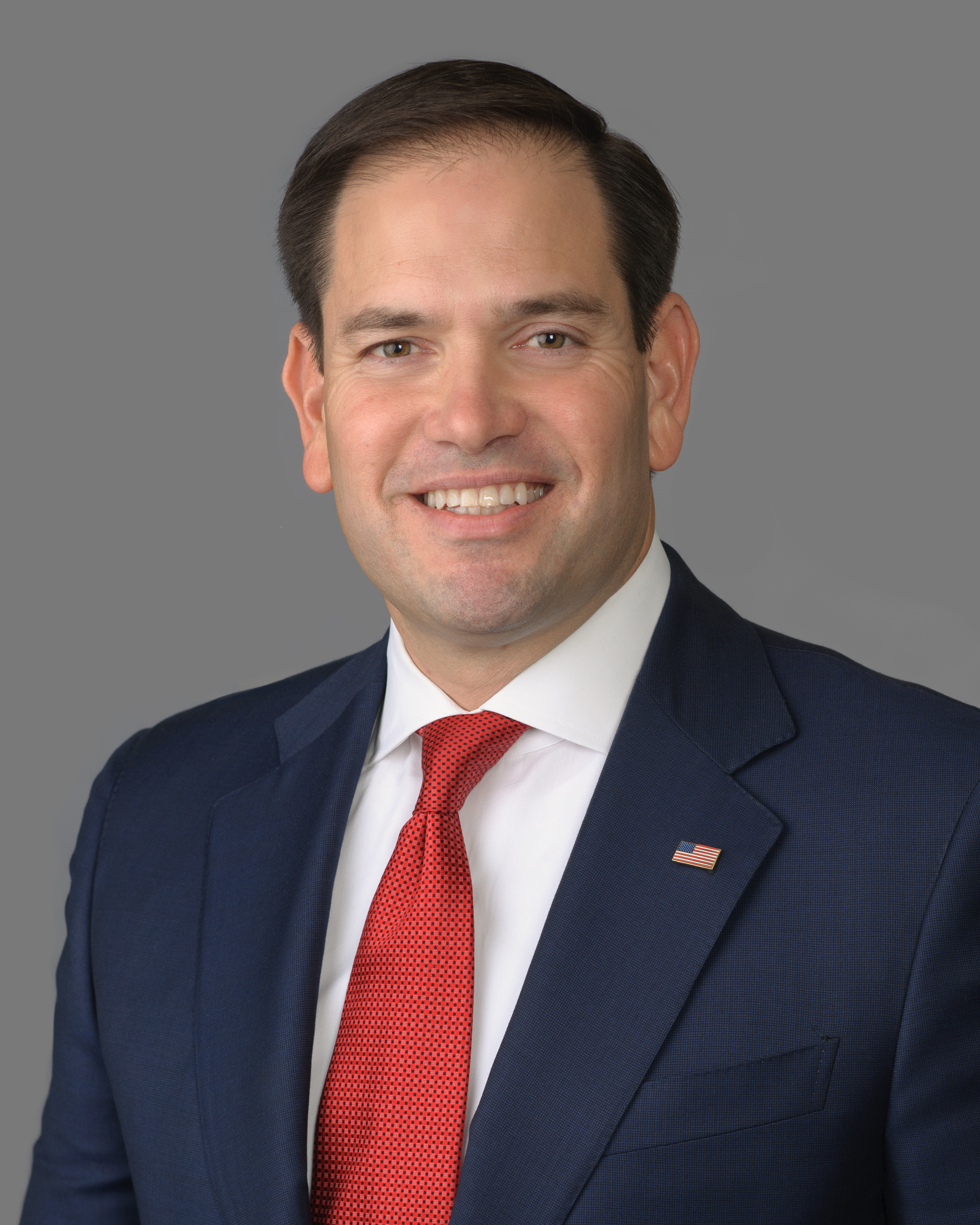
Senator and 2016 presidential candidate
Marco Rubio
from Florida
(2011–2025)

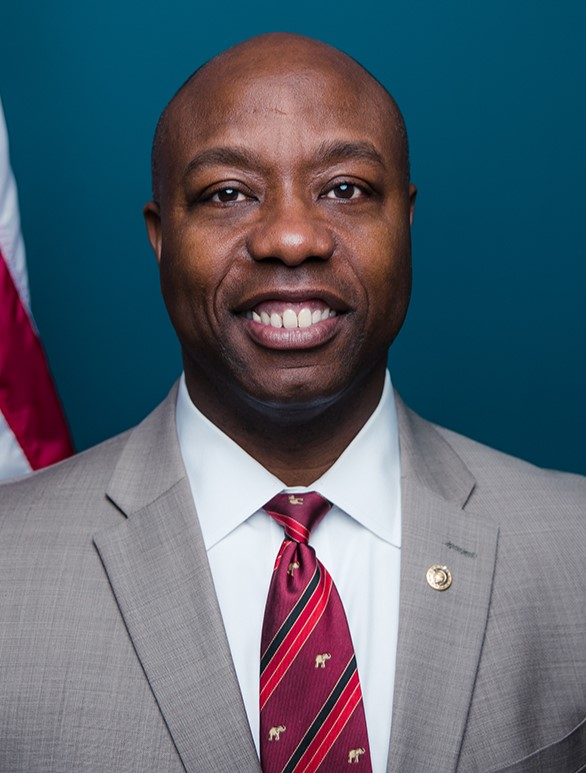
Senator and 2024 presidential candidate
Tim Scott
from South Carolina
(2013–present)

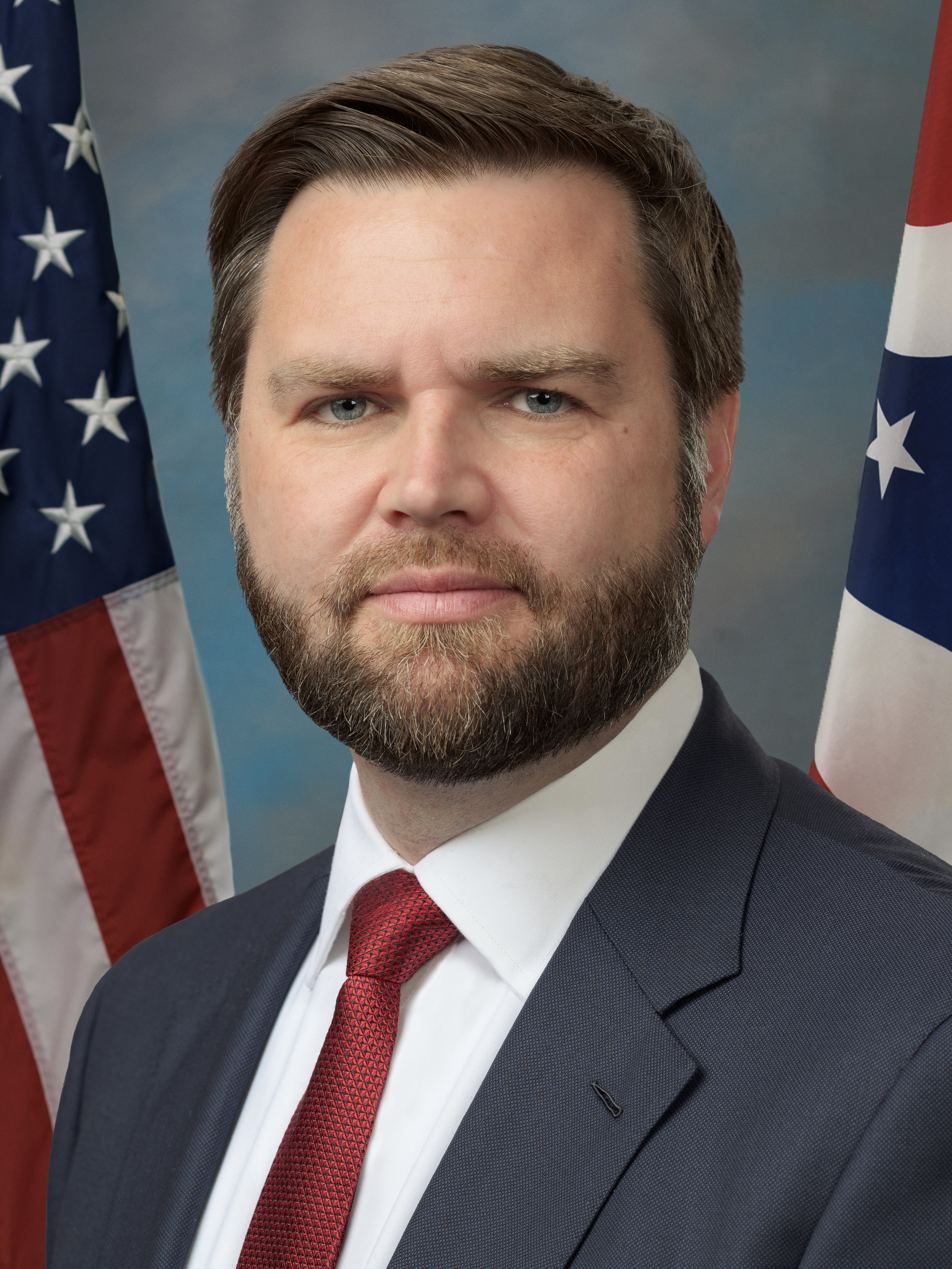
Senator
JD Vance
from Ohio
(2023–2025)

=== Shortlist ===
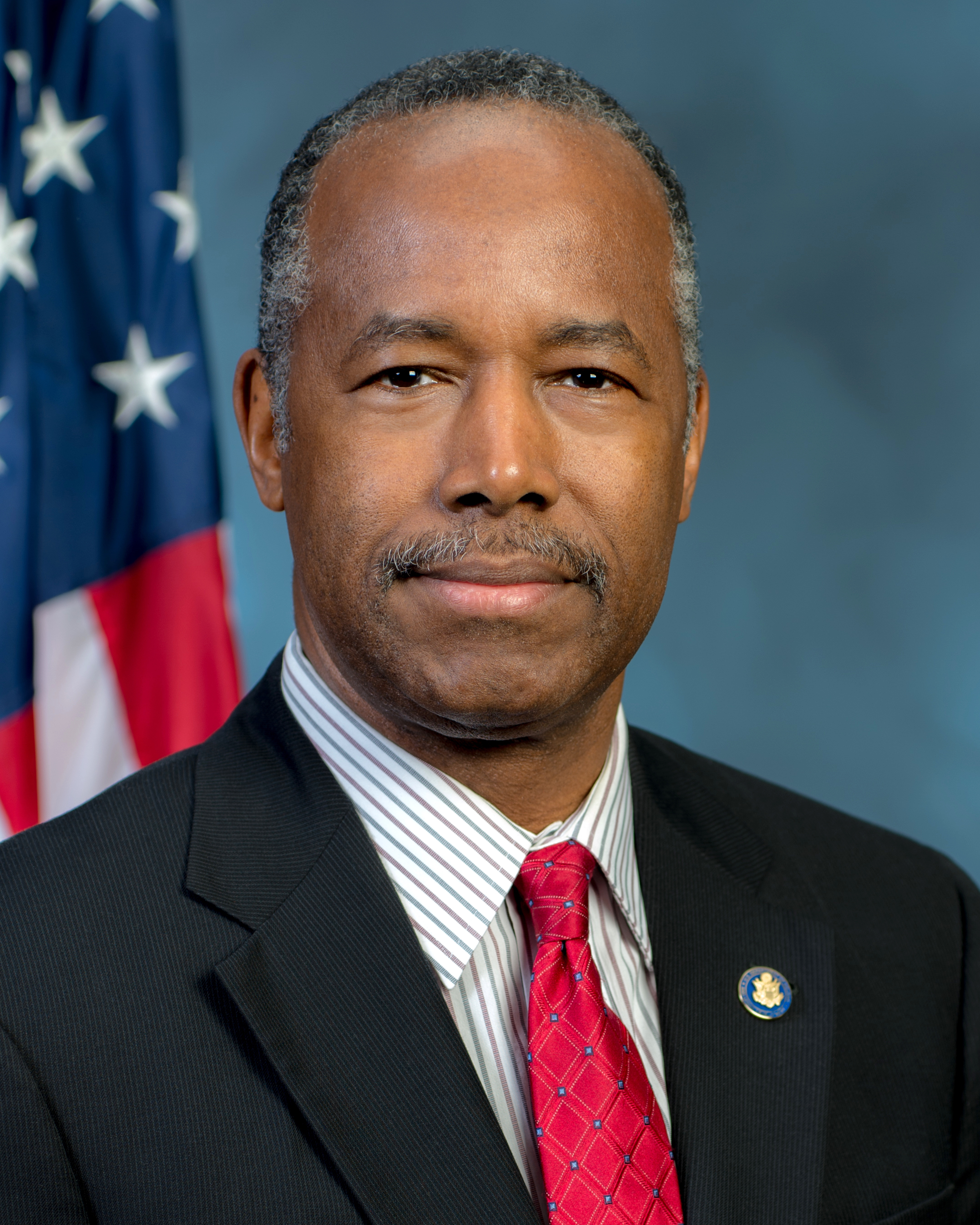
Former HUD Secretary and 2016 presidential candidate
Ben Carson
from Michigan
(2017–2021)

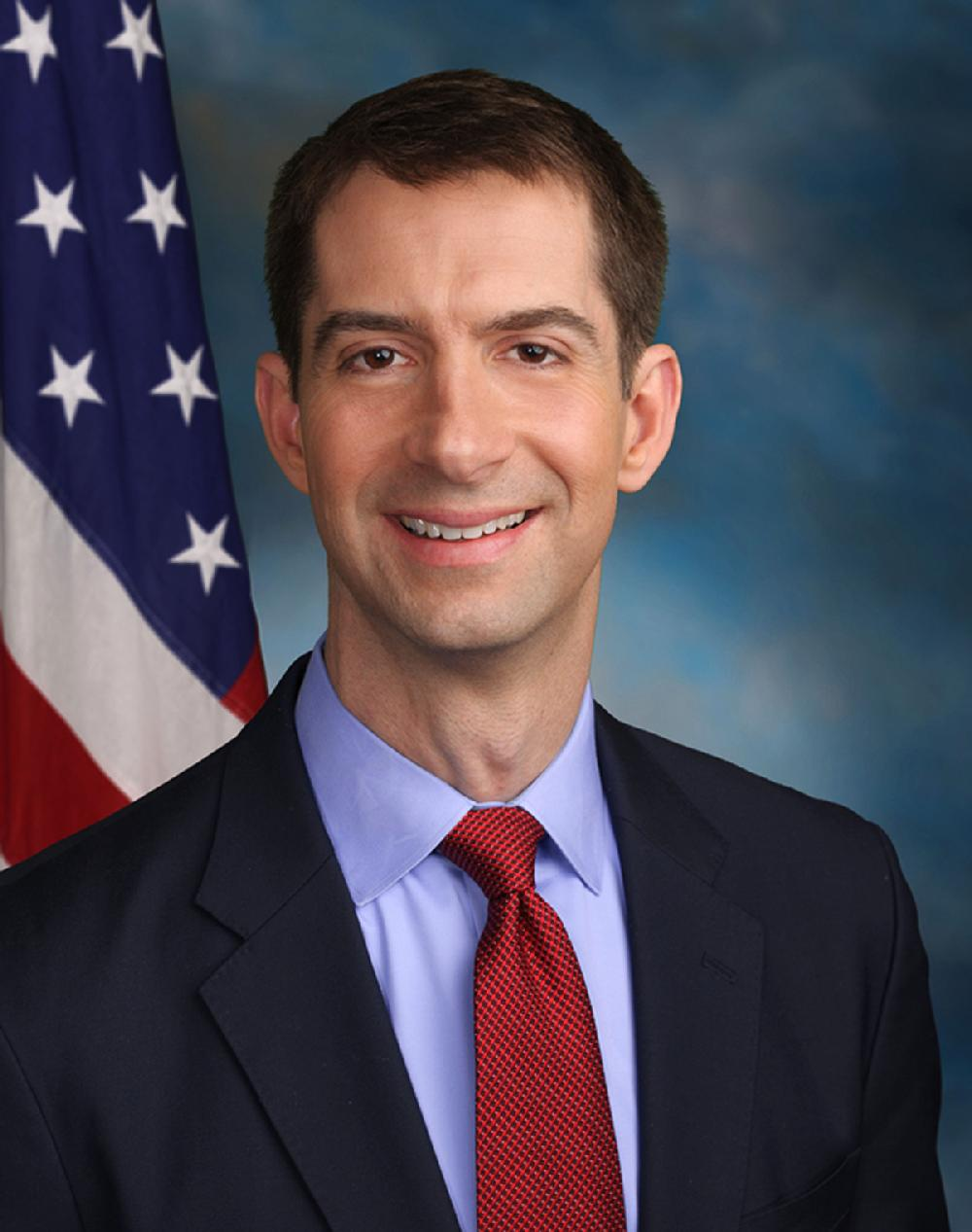
Senator
Tom Cotton
from Arkansas
(2015–present)

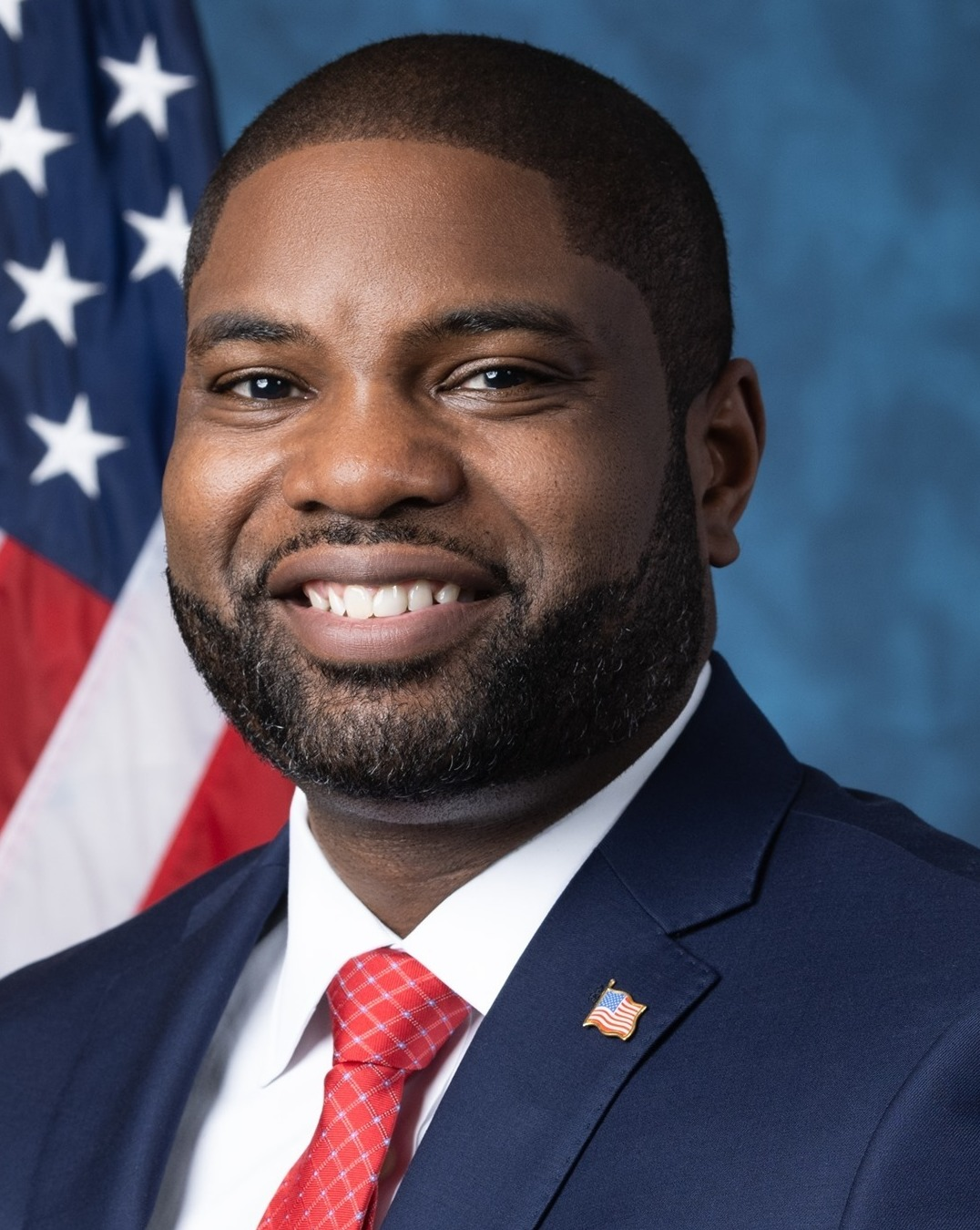
Representative
Byron Donalds
from Florida
(2021–present)

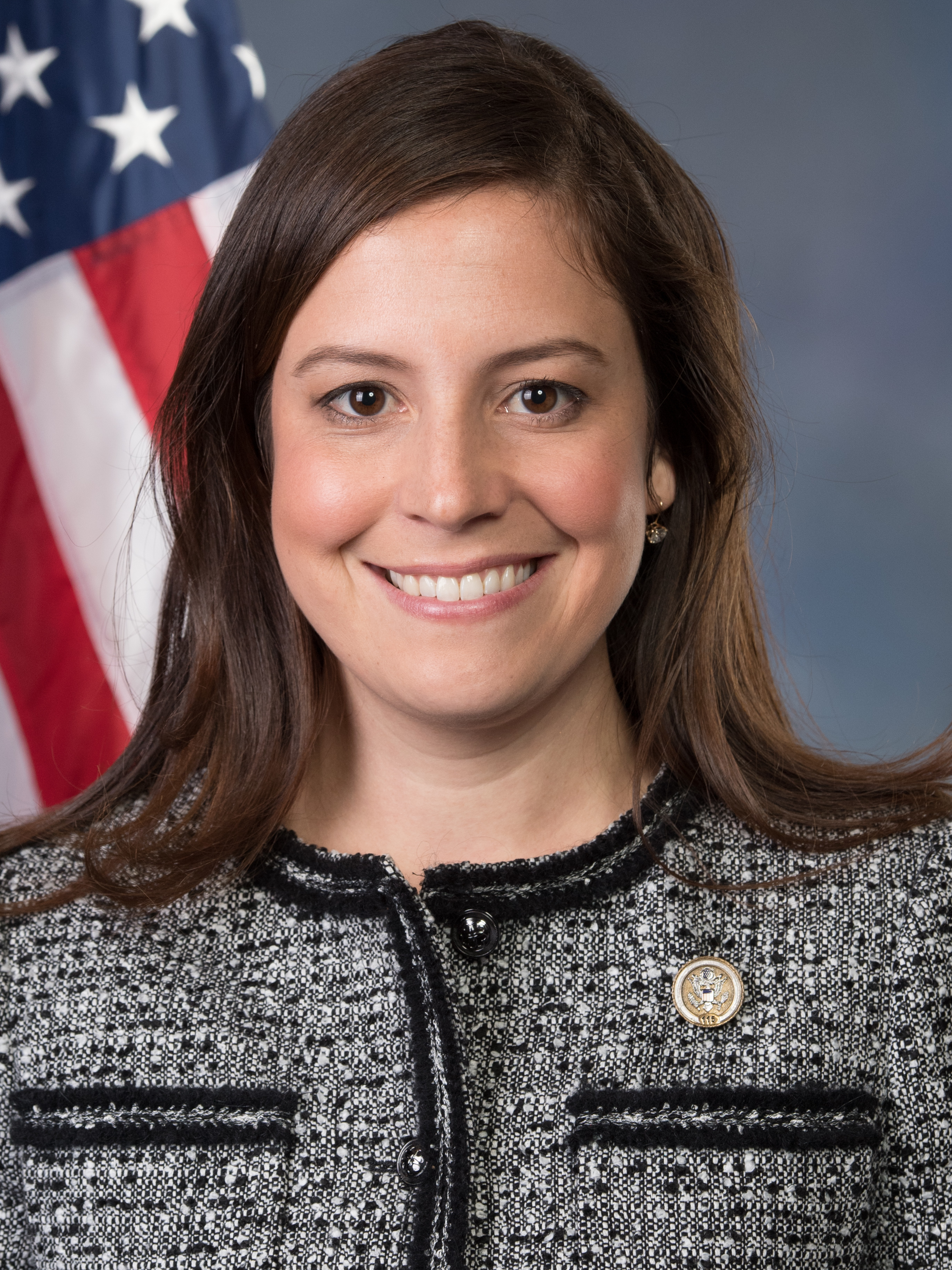
Representative and Chair of the House Republican Conference
Elise Stefanik
from New York
(2015–present)

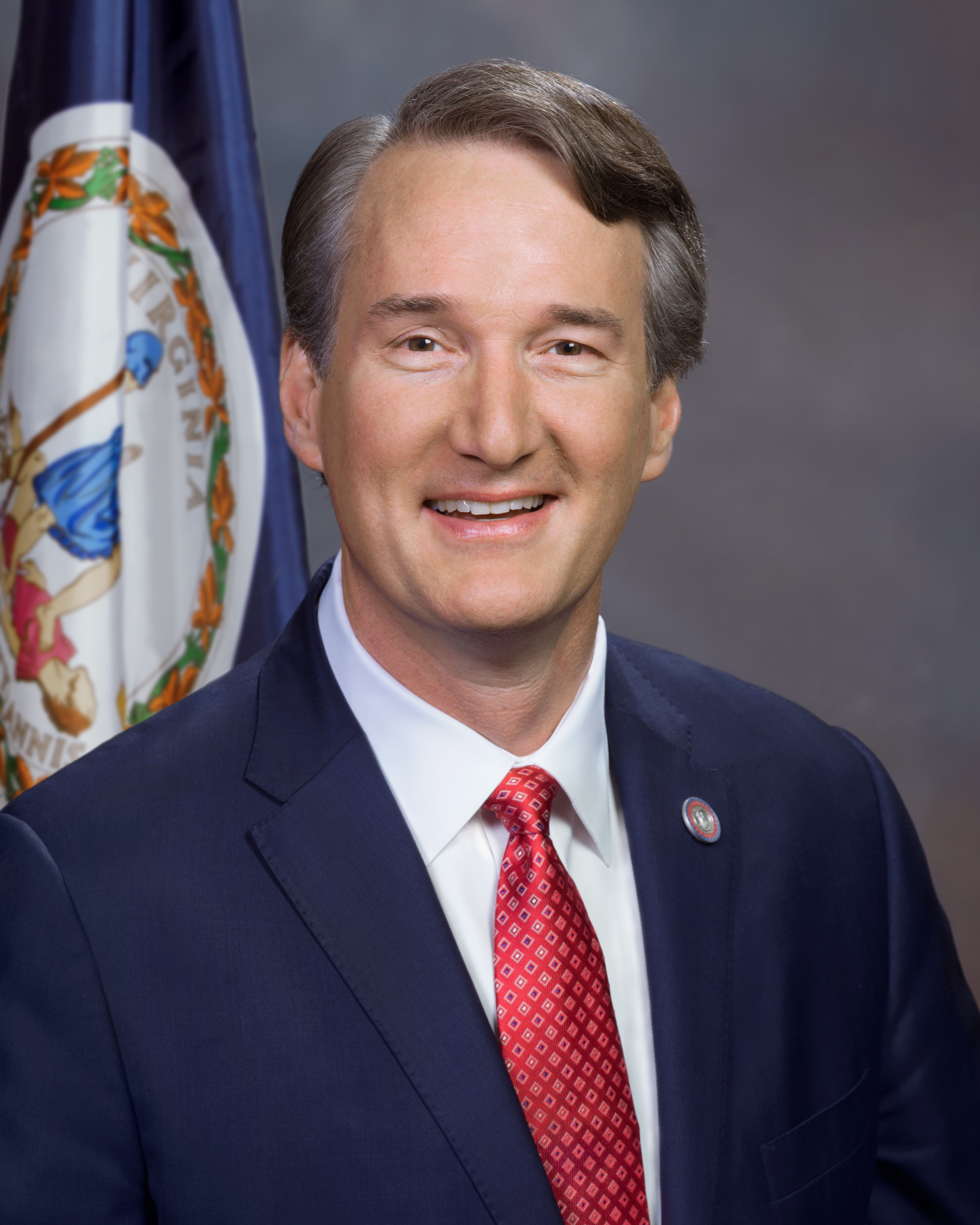
Governor
Glenn Youngkin
of Virginia
(2022–2026)

== Final selection ==
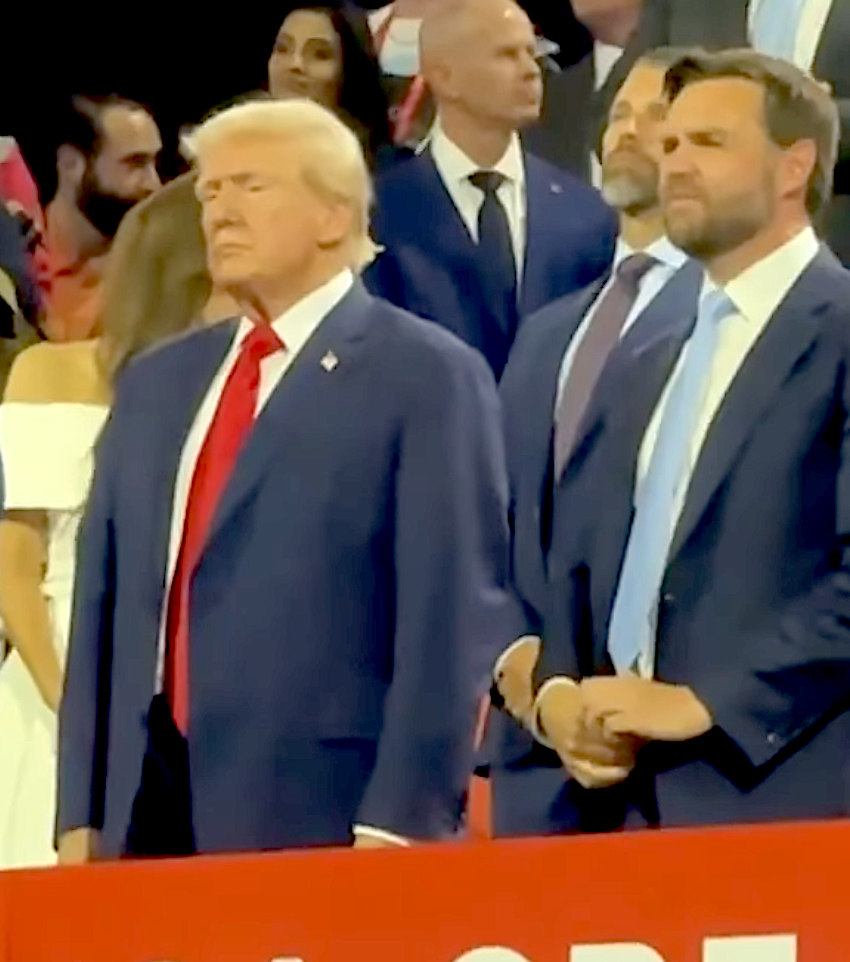
Trump and Vance stand together during the first night of the Republican National Convention

Trump had indicated that he would announce his selection during the Republican National Convention. Before and during the convention, Rubio and Burgum were informed they would not be chosen.

On June 22, NBC News reported that Trump had selected his vice presidential running mate, and they would "most likely" be at the debate on June 27.

On July 8, it was reported by the Associated Press that the unnamed vice presidential nominee already had their own plane with its fuselage empty awaiting to be decorated with the nominee's name. That same day, Jason Miller stated that the reveal announcement could come in the week prior to the convention while Trump said that the announcement would come "probably a little before the convention, but not much. It could even be during the convention that we'd do it".

== Announcement ==
Donald Trump selected JD Vance as his running mate on July 15, 2024, becoming the first major-party candidate to announce his running mate during his party's convention since George H. W. Bush chose Dan Quayle in 1988. Vance's selection made him the first millennial running mate of a major party, and the third youngest running mate (behind John C. Breckinridge, and Richard Nixon) in American history. Vance was serving his first term as senator for Ohio. After he was elected as vice president, Ohio Governor Mike DeWine appointed Lieutenant Governor Jon Husted as Vance's replacement. A special election was held on November 3, 2026, to fill the remainder of Vance's term to be served until January 3, 2029.

== Reception ==
One week after the Republican National Convention, Vance had a net positive rating of minus 6 points, making him the least-liked vice presidential candidate since 1980. On July 22, 2024, Tim Alberta of The Atlantic reported that some members of Trump's inner circle even began questioning whether Vance should be replaced. A number of House Republicans also criticized Vance over his isolationist foreign policy positions, lack of experience, and inability to expand the Republican coalition beyond Trump's base.

=== "Childless cat ladies" comment ===
At the end of July, a 2021 interview of Vance with Tucker Carlson of Fox News triggered further backlash at his selection. In the interview, then-Senate-candidate Vance complained that the U.S. was being run by Democrats, corporate oligarchs, and "a bunch of childless cat ladies who are miserable at their own lives and the choices that they've made and so they want to make the rest of the country miserable, too." He continued, stating "It's just a basic fact — you look at Kamala Harris, Pete Buttigieg, AOC — the entire future of the Democrats is controlled by people without children. And how does it make any sense that we've turned our country over to people who don't really have a direct stake in it?"

His comments drew condemnation from notable figures such as Jennifer Aniston, who does not have children and has been public about her fertility struggles. Ella Emhoff, Kamala Harris's step-daughter, and Kerstin Emhoff, ex-wife of the Second Gentleman Doug Emhoff, also responded to Vance's comments, stating “For over 10 years, since Cole and Ella were teenagers, Kamala has been a co-parent with Doug and I. She is loving, nurturing, fiercely protective, and always present. I love our blended family and am grateful to have her in it.”

In an appearance on The Megyn Kelly Show, Vance responded to the controversy, stating "Obviously it was a sarcastic comment. I’ve got nothing against cats... People are focusing so much on the sarcasm and not on the substance... and the substance of what I said, Megyn — I’m sorry, it is true." On September 11, 2024, following the September Presidential Debate between Donald Trump and Kamala Harris, singer Taylor Swift publicly endorsed Harris. Along with the announcement, Swift posted a photo of herself holding her cat and signed her statement as "Taylor Swift, Childless Cat Lady".

=== Vice presidential debate ===
See Main Article: 2024 United States Presidential Debates

On October 1, Vance and Tim Walz participated in a 90-minute Vice Presidential debate hosted by CBS. The debate was moderated by Margaret Brennan and Norah O'Donnell.

The VP debate was broadly considered a polite and policy-focused event, in which Vance and Walz agreed with each other a lot and maintained civility throughout; after the debate, they chatted and introduced their wives to each other. Columnists from The Washington Post and Reuters commended both Vance and Walz for the high level of civility and focus on policy in the debate. According to a flash poll by CBS News and YouGov, 88 percent of viewers found the tone of the debate was "generally positive".

Following the debate, The New York Times wrote that Vance delivered "one of the best debating performances by a Republican nominee for president or vice president in recent memory", making a strong case for Trump's record while also emphasizing his own personal biography, after facing weeks of attacks from the Democrats. Vance's debate performance was praised by political pundits, and he was declared the winner by columnists from The New York Times, The Wall Street Journal, the Los Angeles Times, USA Today, the Financial Times, and Politico.

== Media speculation on possible candidates ==
Speculative shortlists by Trump had included various names, and evolved throughout the campaign. Trump's primary criterion for his running mate was loyalty, according to multiple sources. In early 2024, Reuters reported that Trump had been encouraged by associates to consider a woman or a black man as his running mate.

Reportedly in 2022, Trump had "repeatedly" discussed the possibility of choosing Representative Marjorie Taylor Greene as his running mate. Greene also claimed that she had been in talks with Trump to become his running mate. On March 6, 2023, multiple sources close to Trump, as reported by Axios, narrowed the list down to four major contenders: Nikki Haley; Governor Sarah Huckabee Sanders of Arkansas, former White House press secretary for Trump; Governor Kristi Noem of South Dakota; and Kari Lake, candidate for Arizona governor in 2022 who lost narrowly to Katie Hobbs. On July 3, 2023, Politico reported that sources close to Sanders said that she was not interested in being chosen as the vice presidential nominee as "she intends to serve as governor for eight years." On August 24, 2023, Trump in a media interview mentioned Noem, Governor Henry McMaster of South Carolina, and former primary opponent and businessman Vivek Ramaswamy as potential vice president picks.

Trump acknowledged a total of six names on his vice presidential shortlist at a Fox News townhall with Laura Ingraham in February 2024: Kristi Noem, Vivek Ramaswamy, Governor Ron DeSantis of Florida, Senator Tim Scott of South Carolina, Representative Byron Donalds of Florida, and former Representative Tulsi Gabbard of Hawaii. Of those six, DeSantis declined to be considered that same month, and while Ramaswamy was reportedly ruled out in March, he was back in consideration by May. In March, Trump estimated that there were a total of 15 people on his shortlist in an interview with Newsmax. Three additional names were reported to have been revealed: former HUD Secretary Ben Carson, Senator Marco Rubio of Florida, and Representative Elise Stefanik of New York. In late March, four others were added to the list: Sarah Huckabee Sanders, Governor Doug Burgum of North Dakota, Senator Katie Britt of Alabama, and Senator JD Vance of Ohio. The chances of Noem being selected reportedly waned in April 2024 because of her hardline stance on abortion and backlash to a revelation in her autobiography that she shot and killed her pet dog. As of April 30, Sanders reportedly had "slipp[ed] down the list" for not endorsing Trump quickly enough.

On July 11, 2024, it was reported that Donald Trump Jr. would speak at the 2024 Republican National Convention preceding the vice presidential pick, prompting speculation that Vance is the selected vice presidential candidate, as he and Trump Jr. have a close relationship. Trump Jr. later said "I exerted 10,000% of my political capital" to persuade his father to choose Vance: "I may get a favor from my father in like, 2076. I used it all".

The attempted assassination of Donald Trump led to speculation over its potential impact on Trump's decision on the vice presidential nominee and the manner in which the selection would be announced.

=== Federal executive branch officials ===
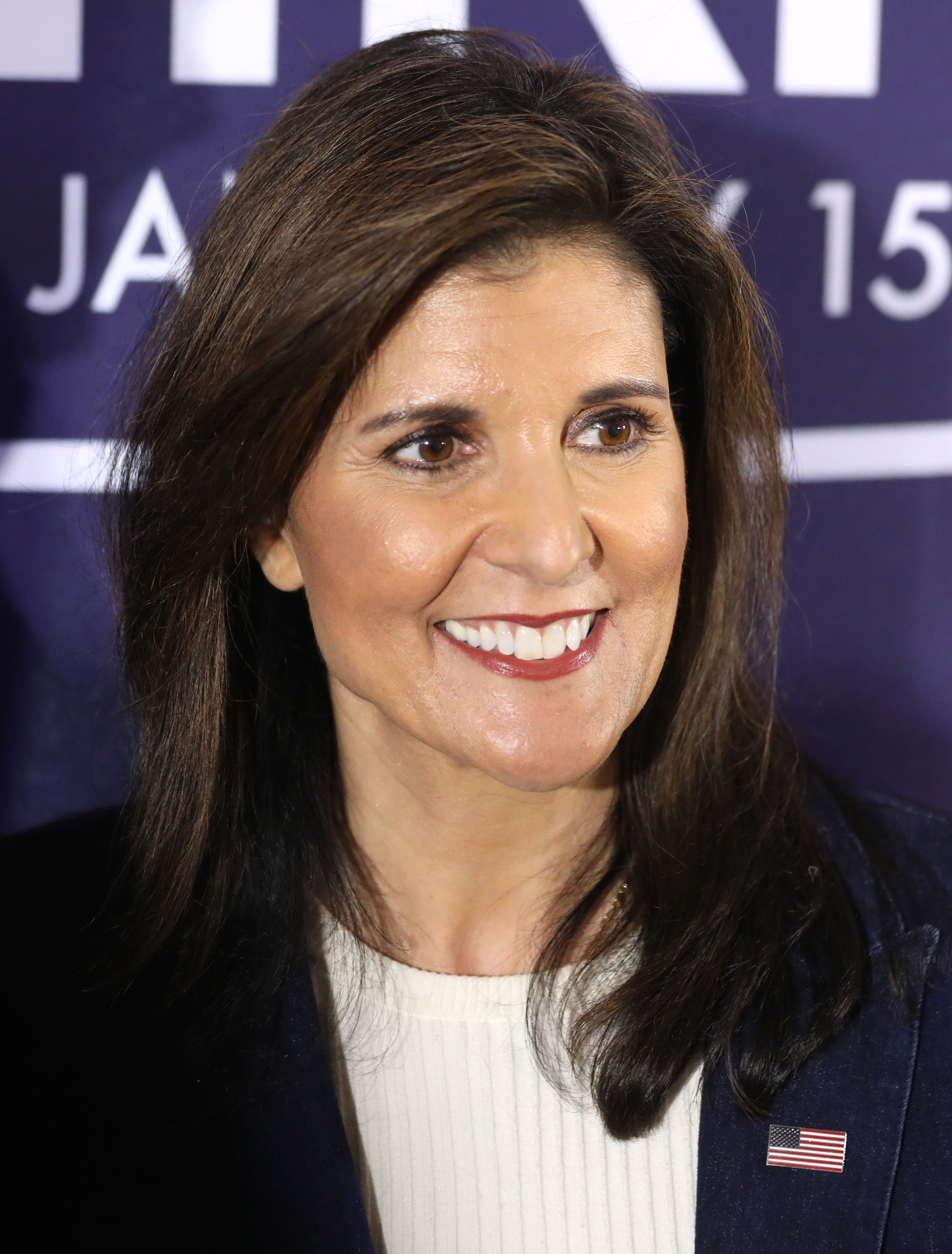
UN Ambassador and 2024 presidential candidate
Nikki Haley
from South Carolina
(2017–2018)

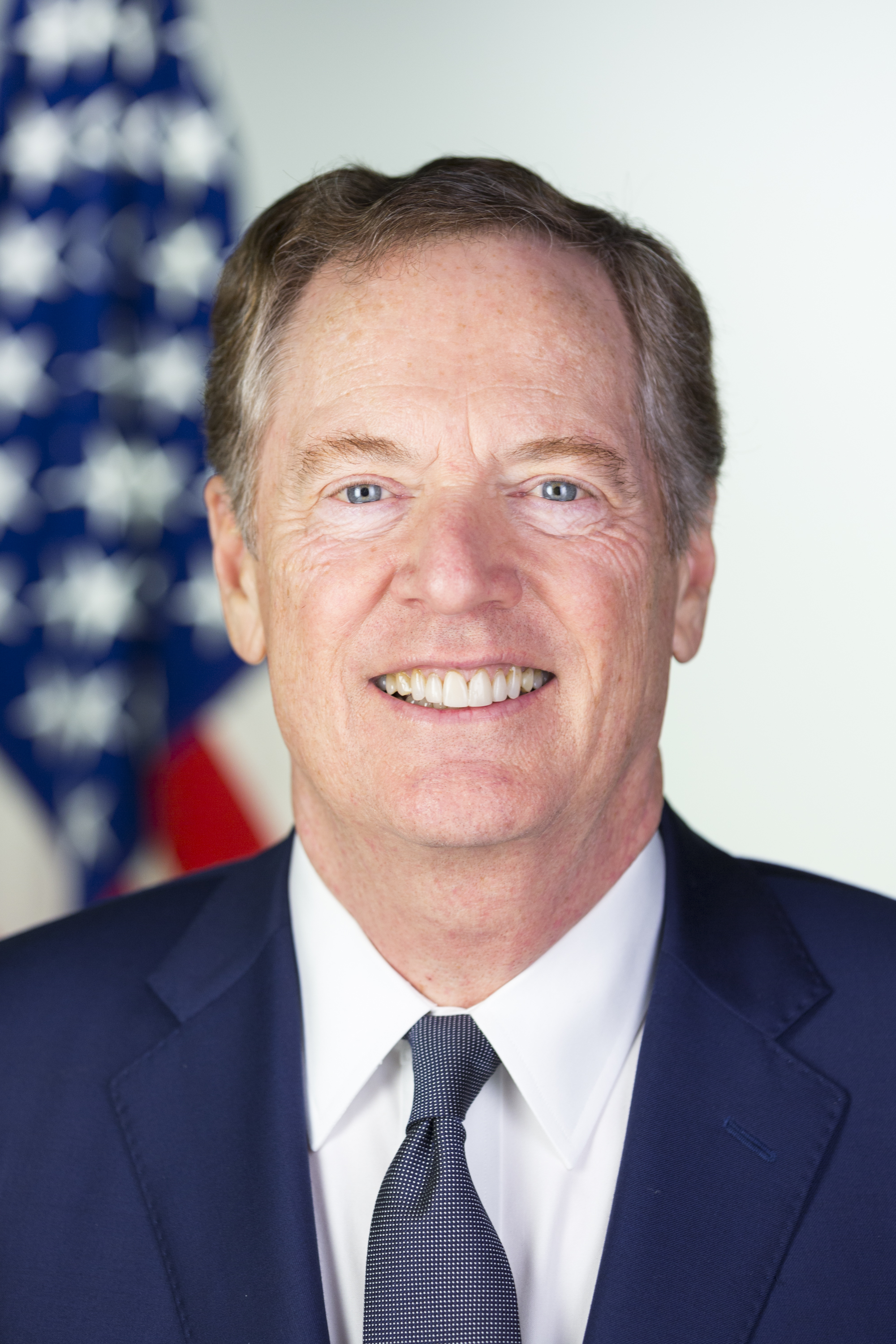
United States Trade Representative
Robert Lighthizer
from Florida
(2017–2021)

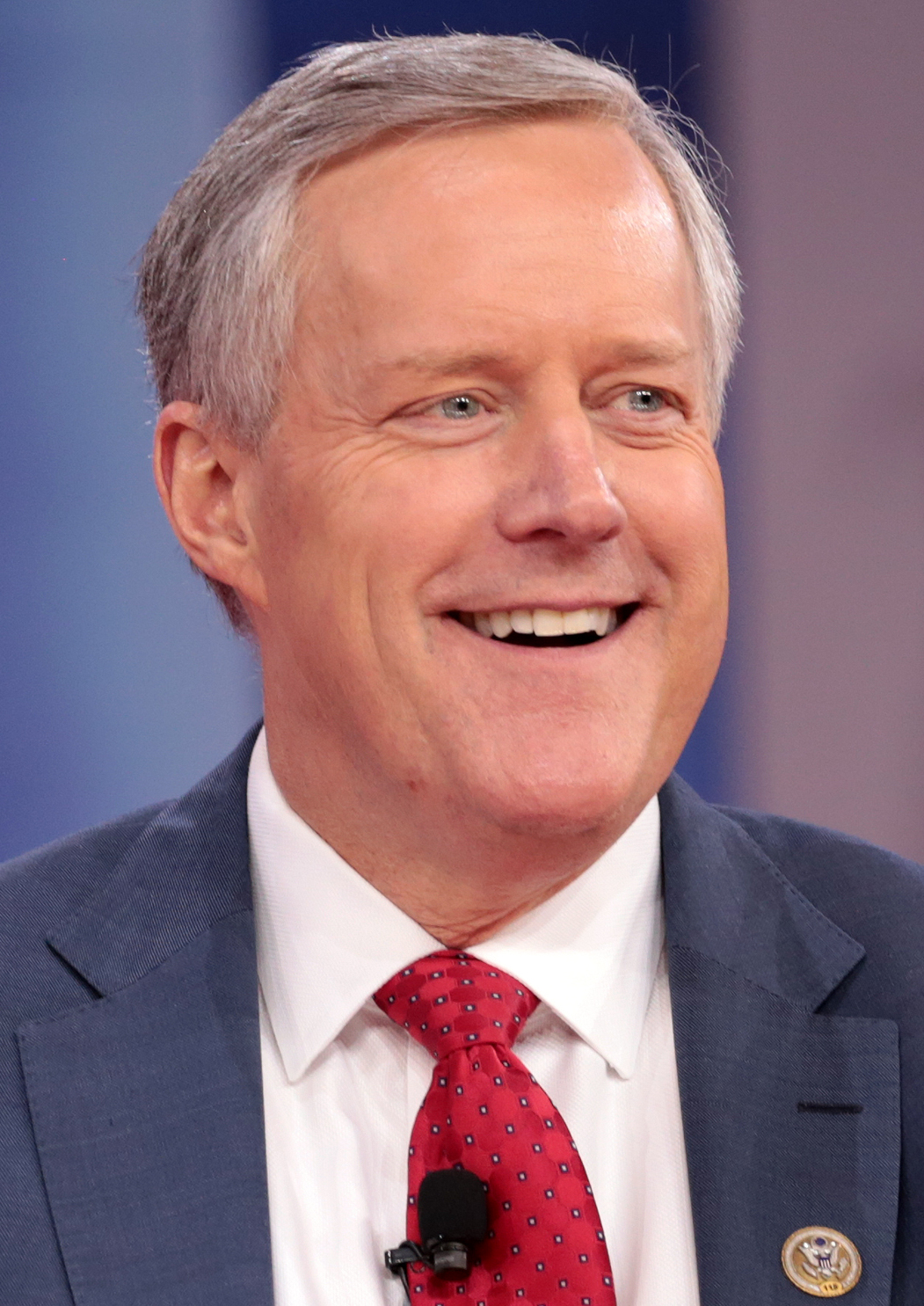
White House Chief of Staff
Mark Meadows
from North Carolina
(2020–2021)

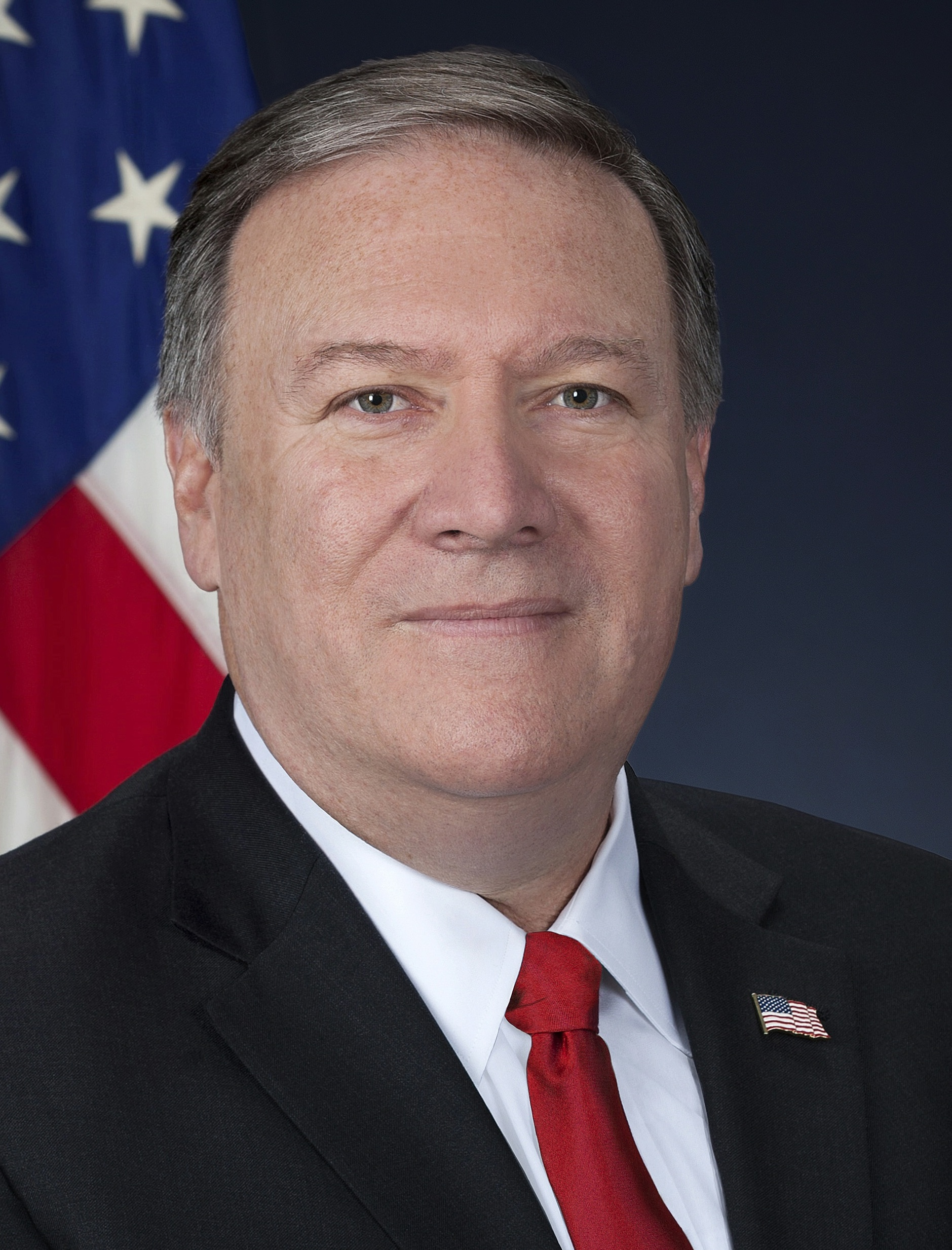
Secretary of State
Mike Pompeo
from Kansas
(2018–2021)

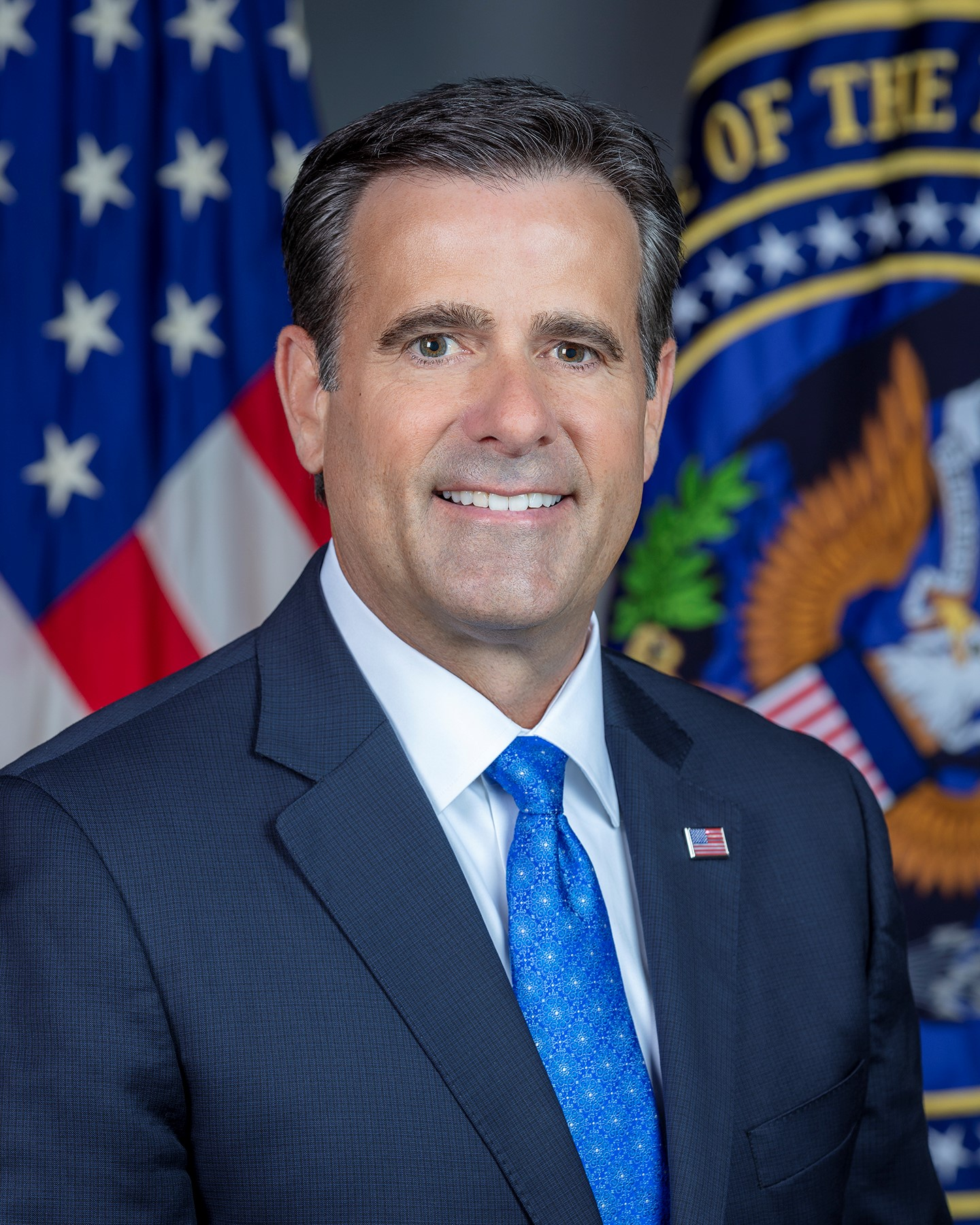
Director of National Intelligence
John Ratcliffe
from Texas
(2020–2021)

=== Members of Congress ===
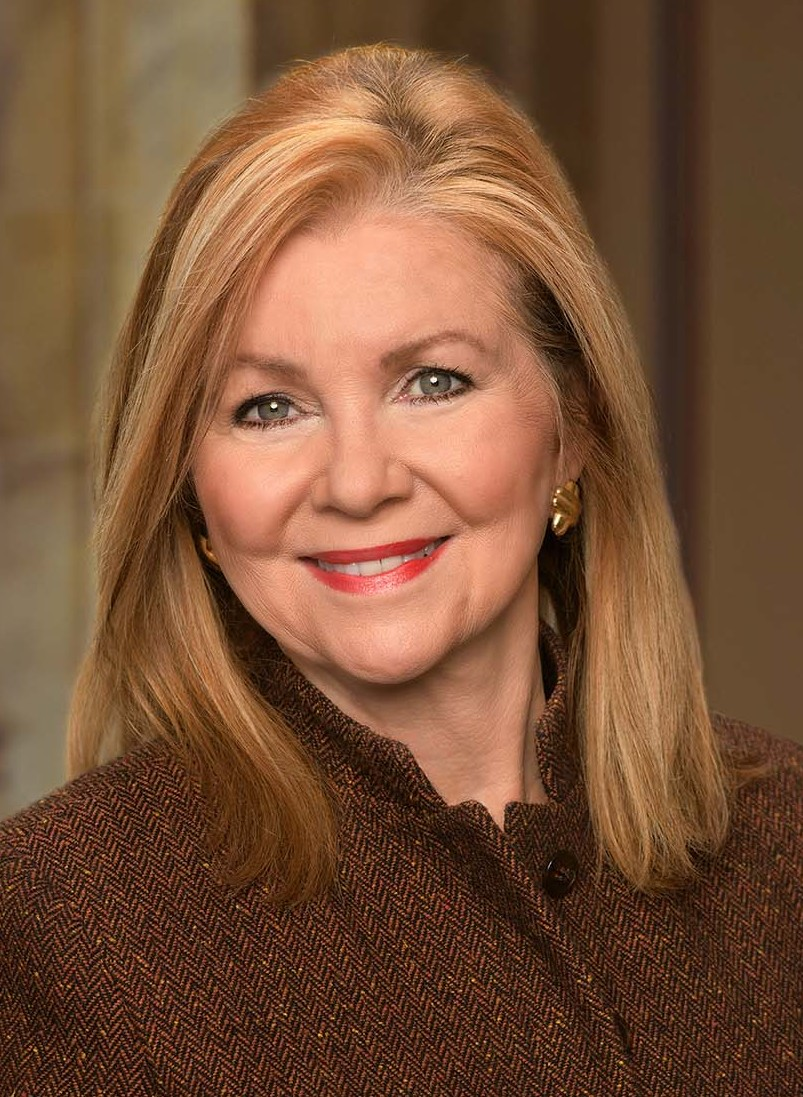
Senator
Marsha Blackburn
from Tennessee
(2019–present)

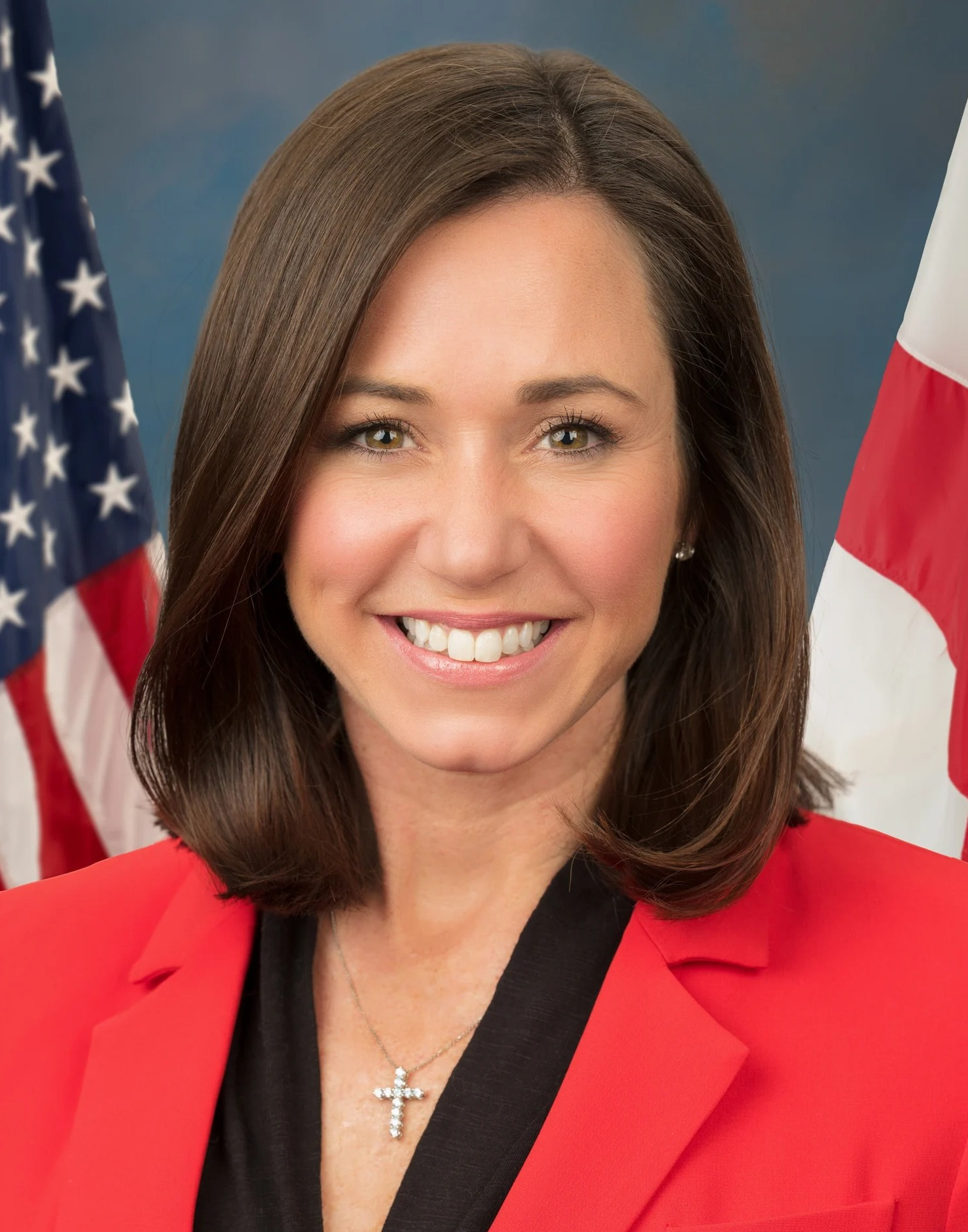
Senator
Katie Britt
from Alabama
(2023–present)

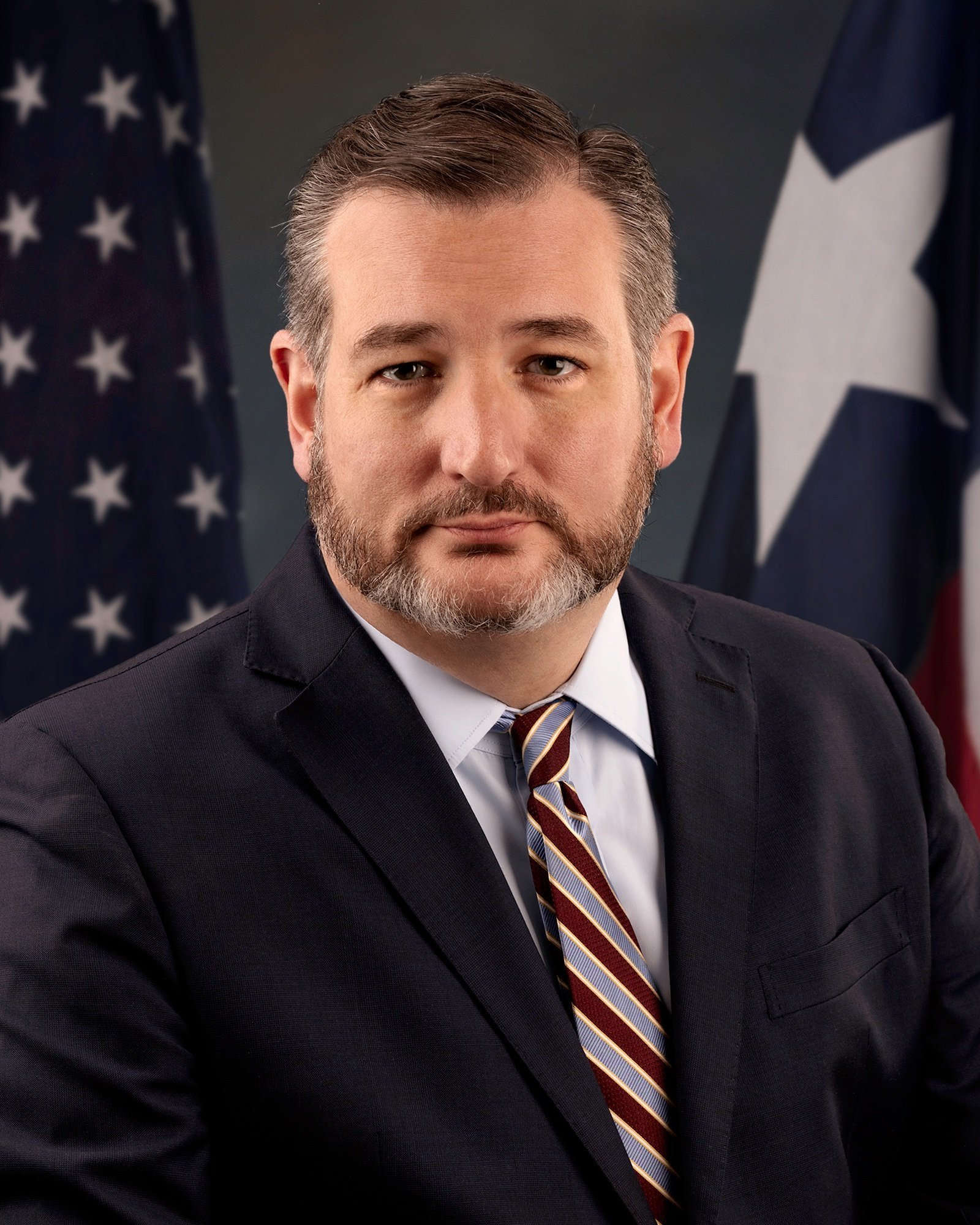
Senator and 2016 presidential candidate
Ted Cruz
from Texas
(2013–present)

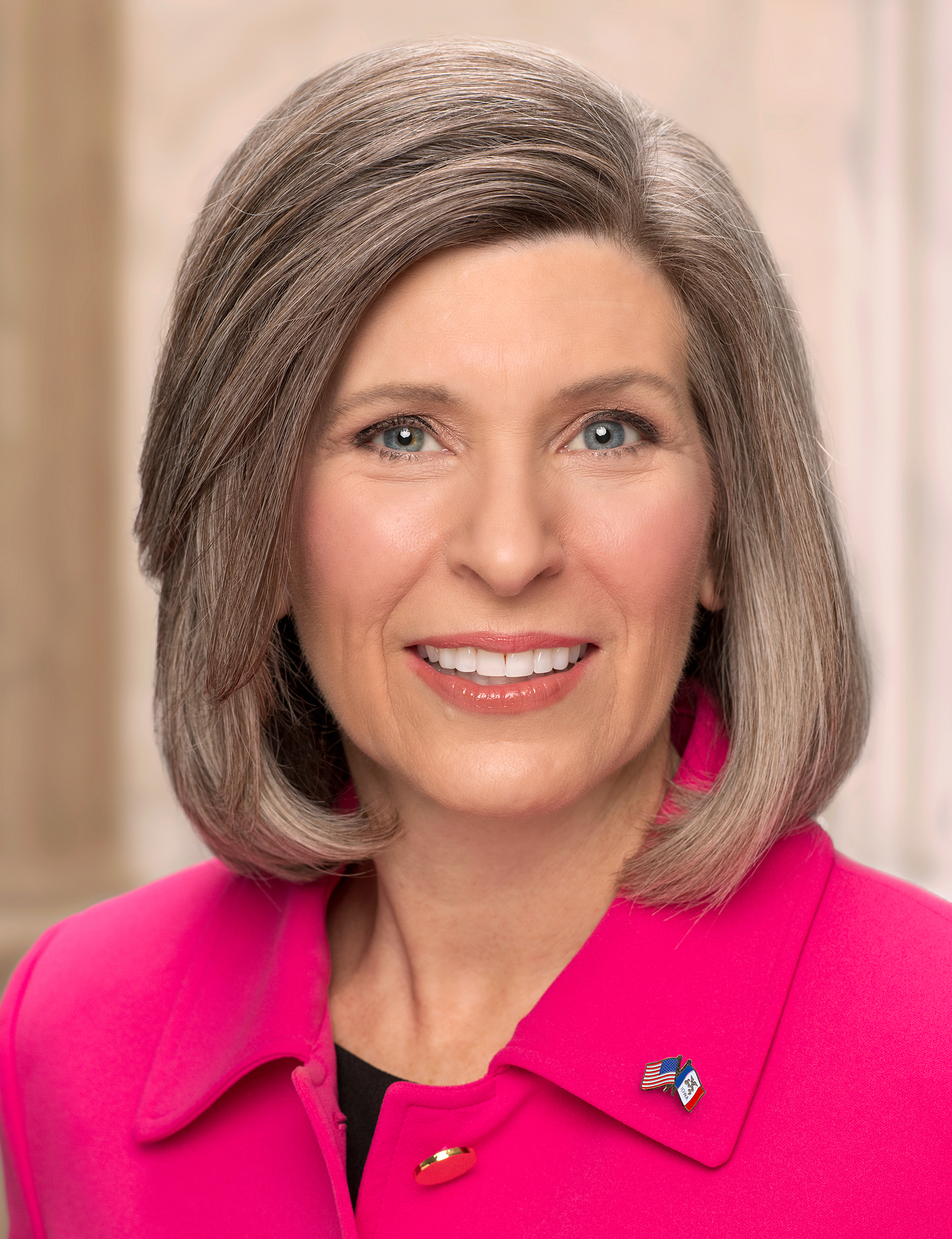
Senator
Joni Ernst
from Iowa
(2015–present)

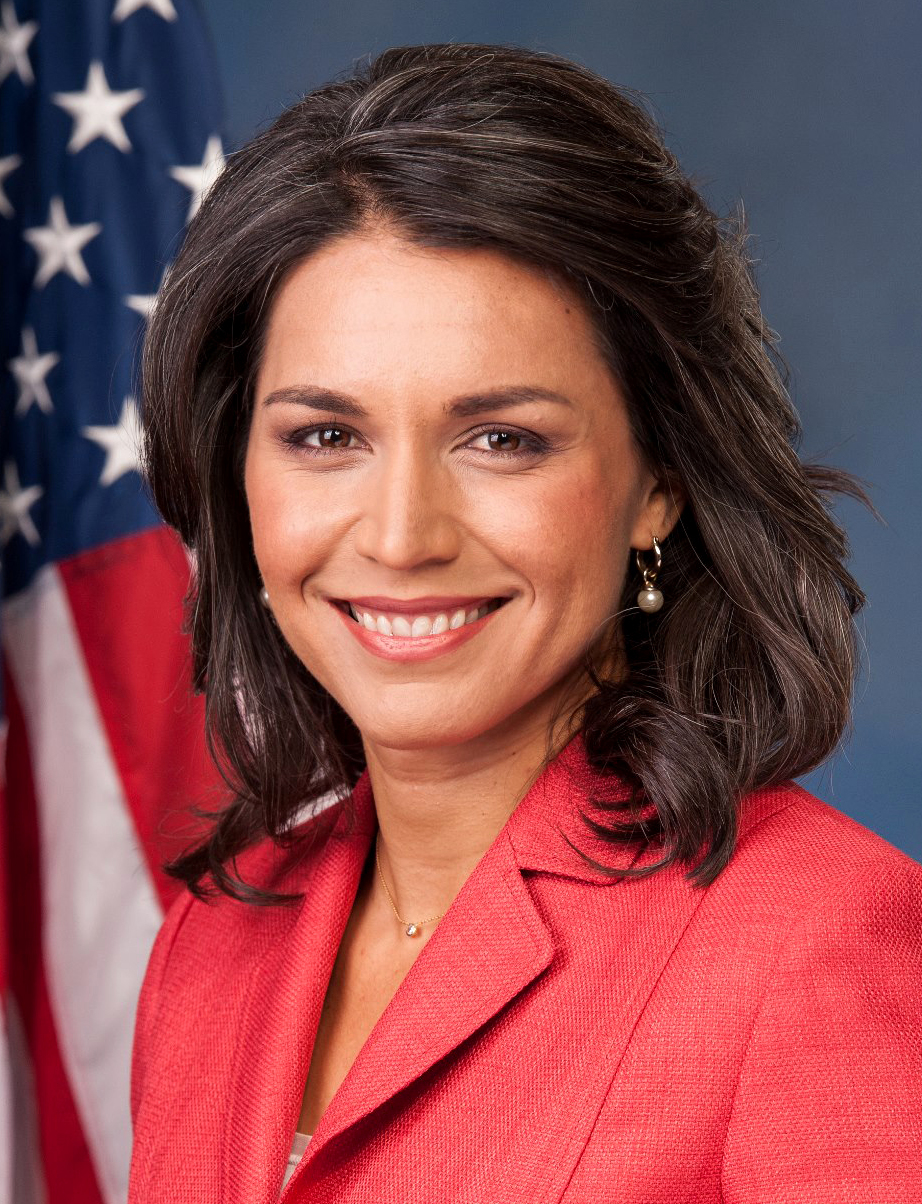
Former Representative and 2020 Democratic presidential candidate
Tulsi Gabbard
from Hawaii
(2013–2021)
(Independent)

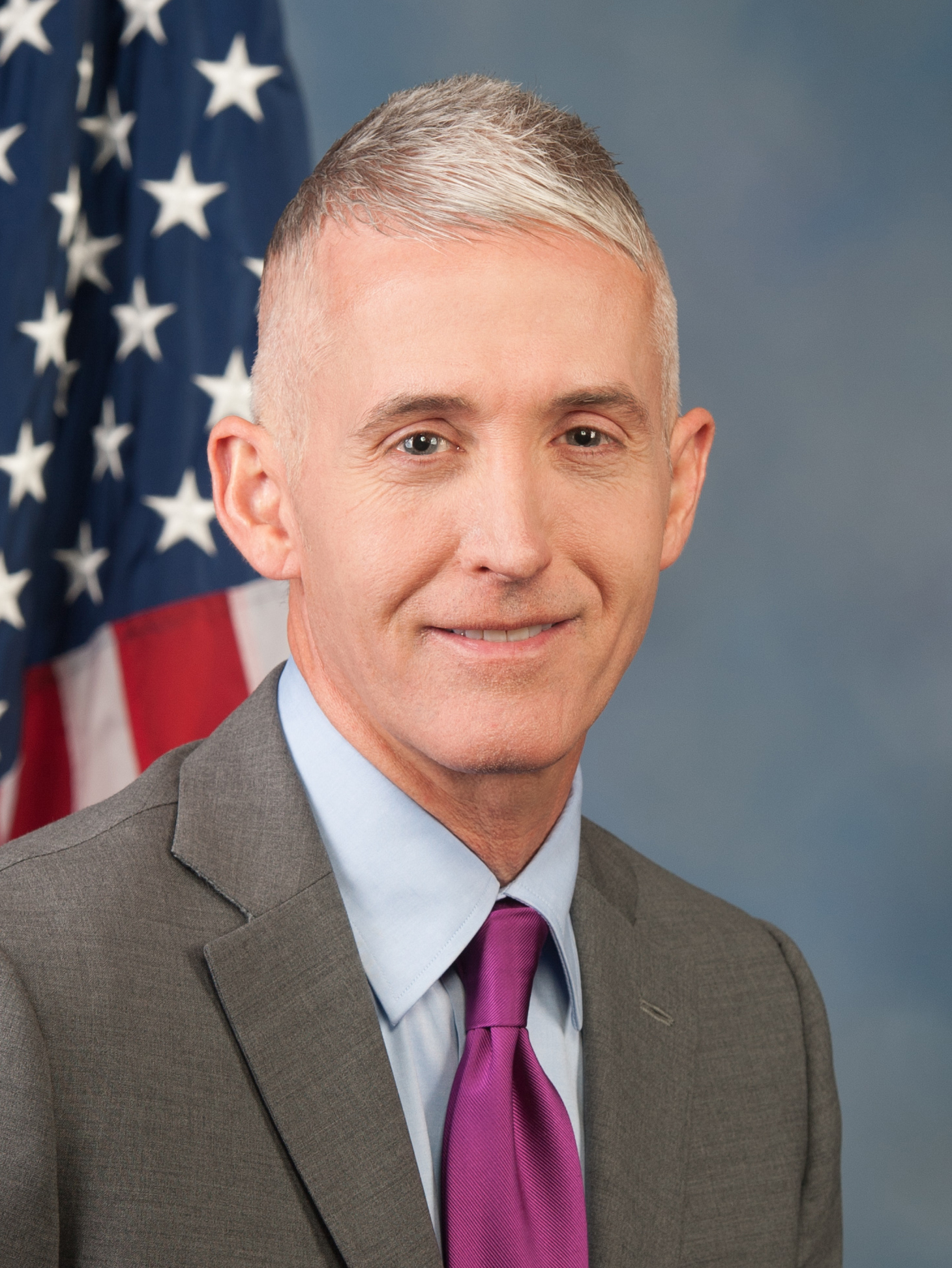
Former Representative
Trey Gowdy
from South Carolina
(2011–2019)

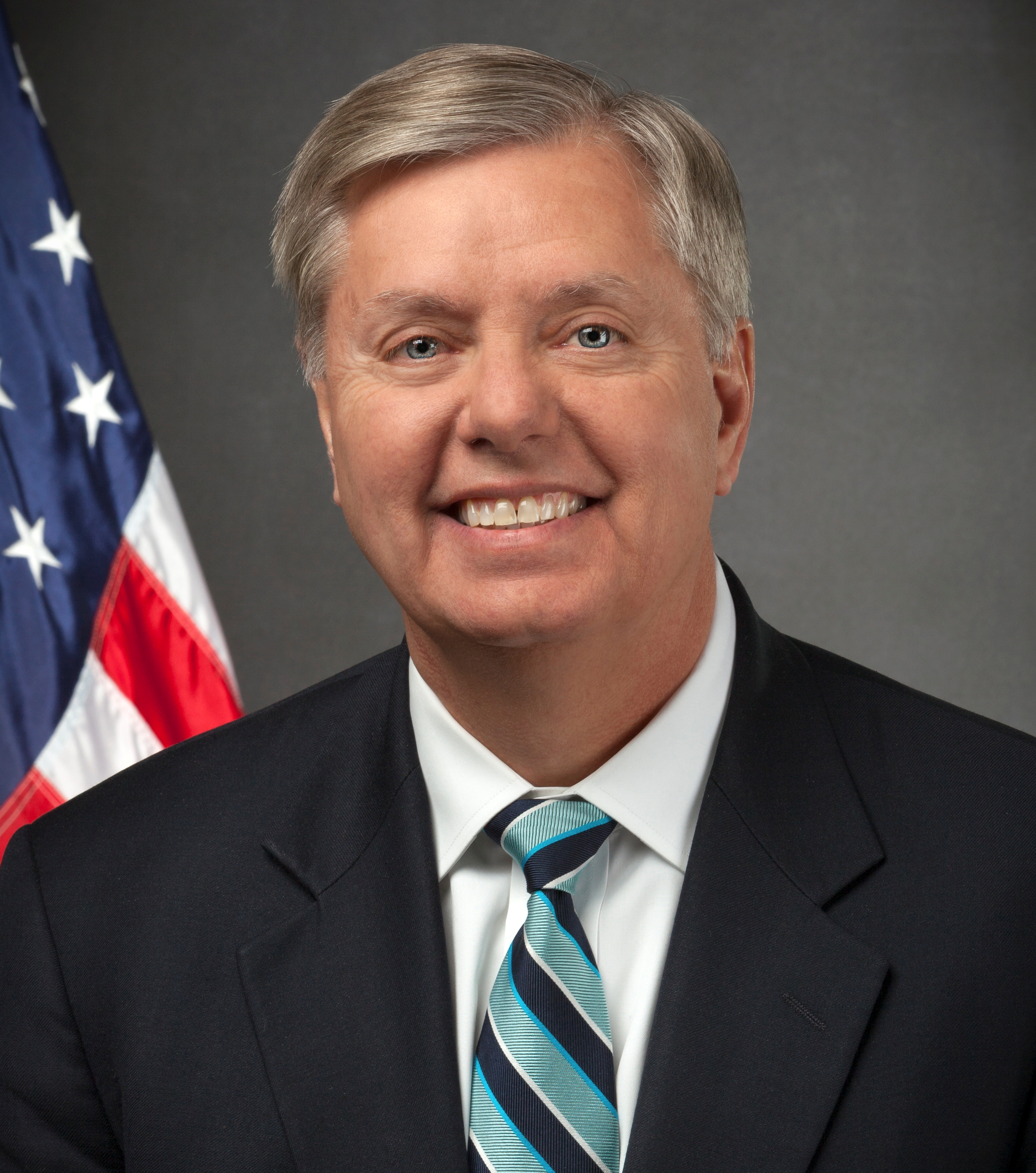
Senator and 2016 presidential candidate
Lindsey Graham
from South Carolina
(2003–2026)

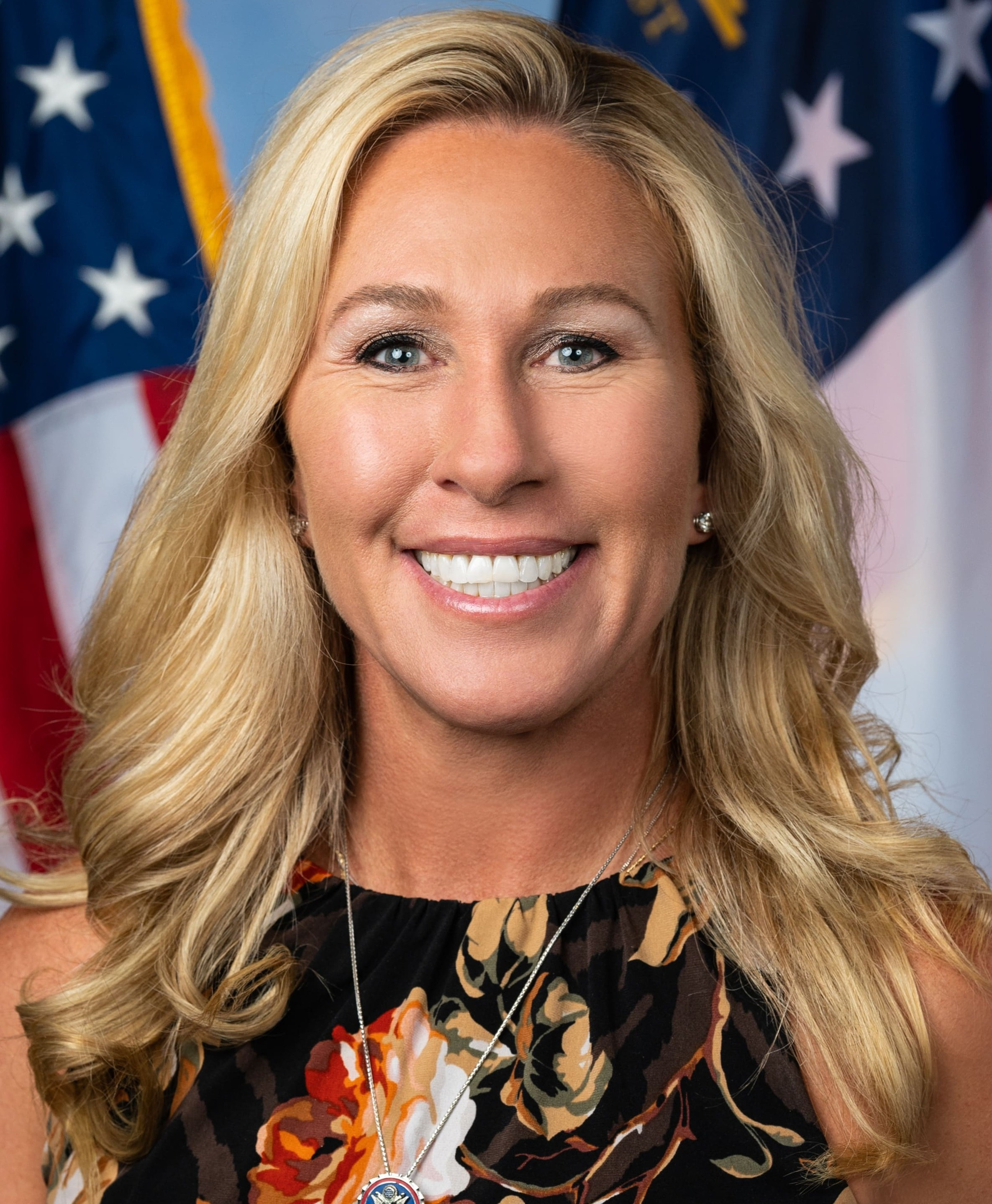
Representative
Marjorie Taylor Greene
from Georgia
(2021–2026)

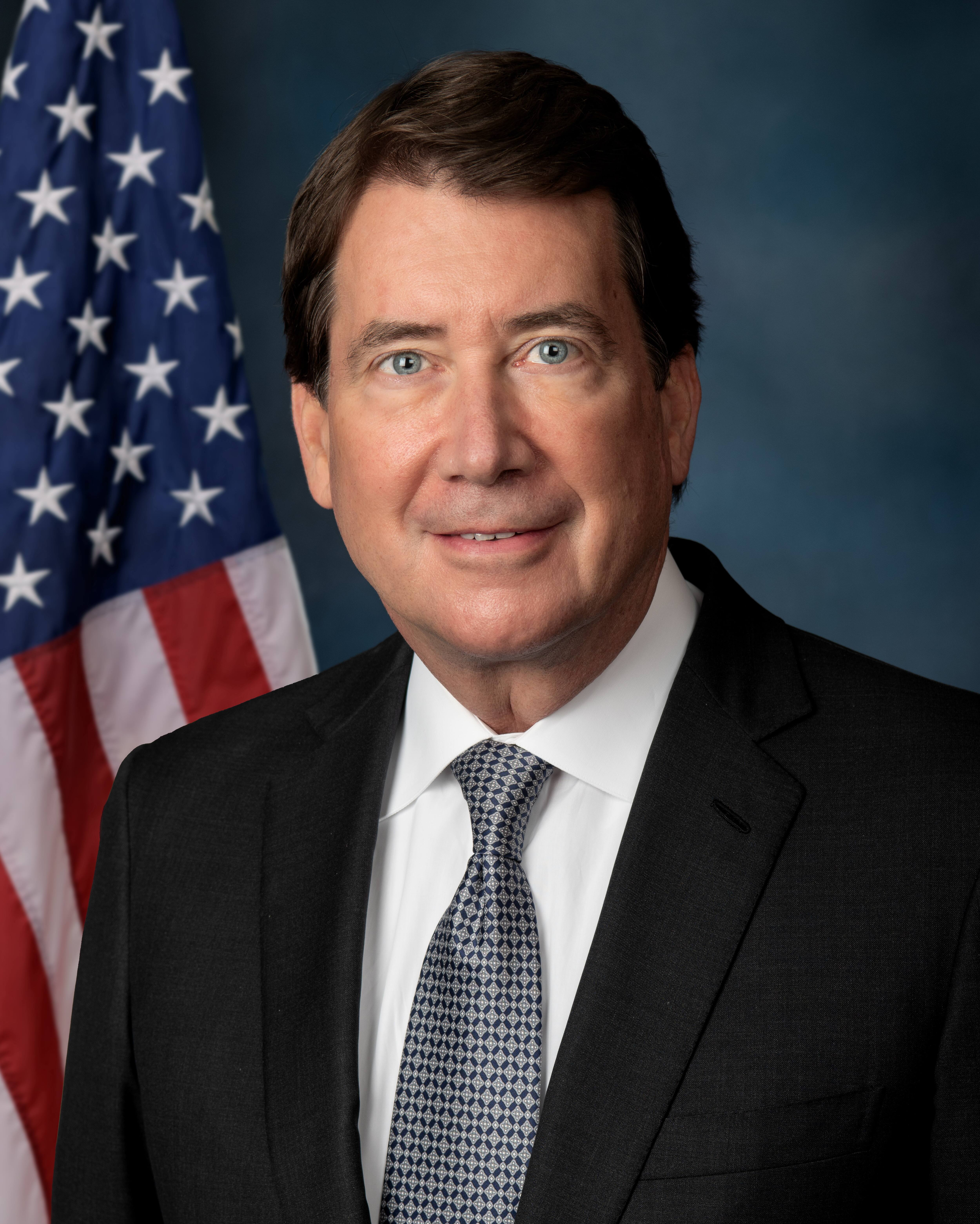
Senator
Bill Hagerty
from Tennessee
(2021–present)

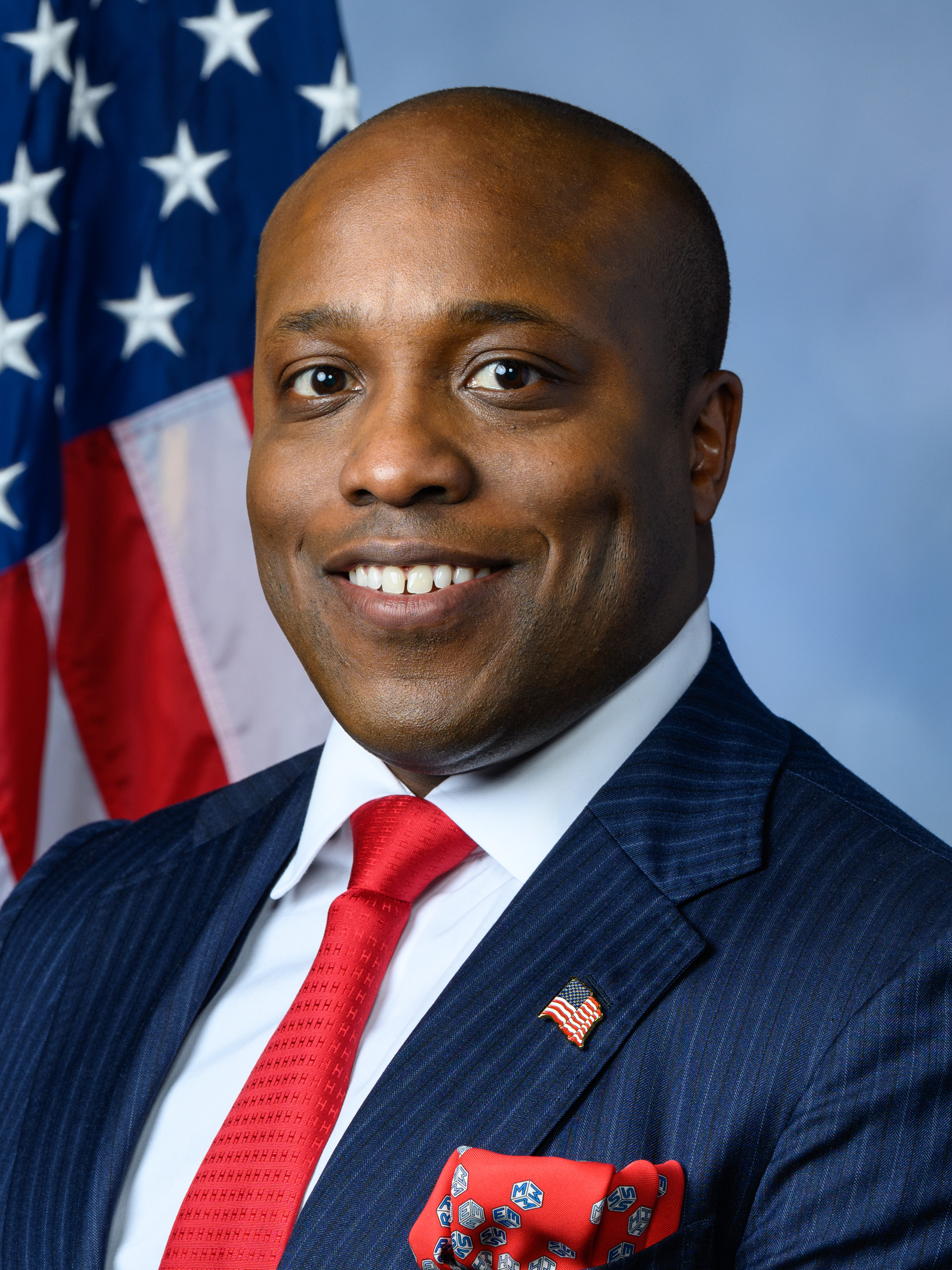
Representative
Wesley Hunt
from Texas
(2023–present)

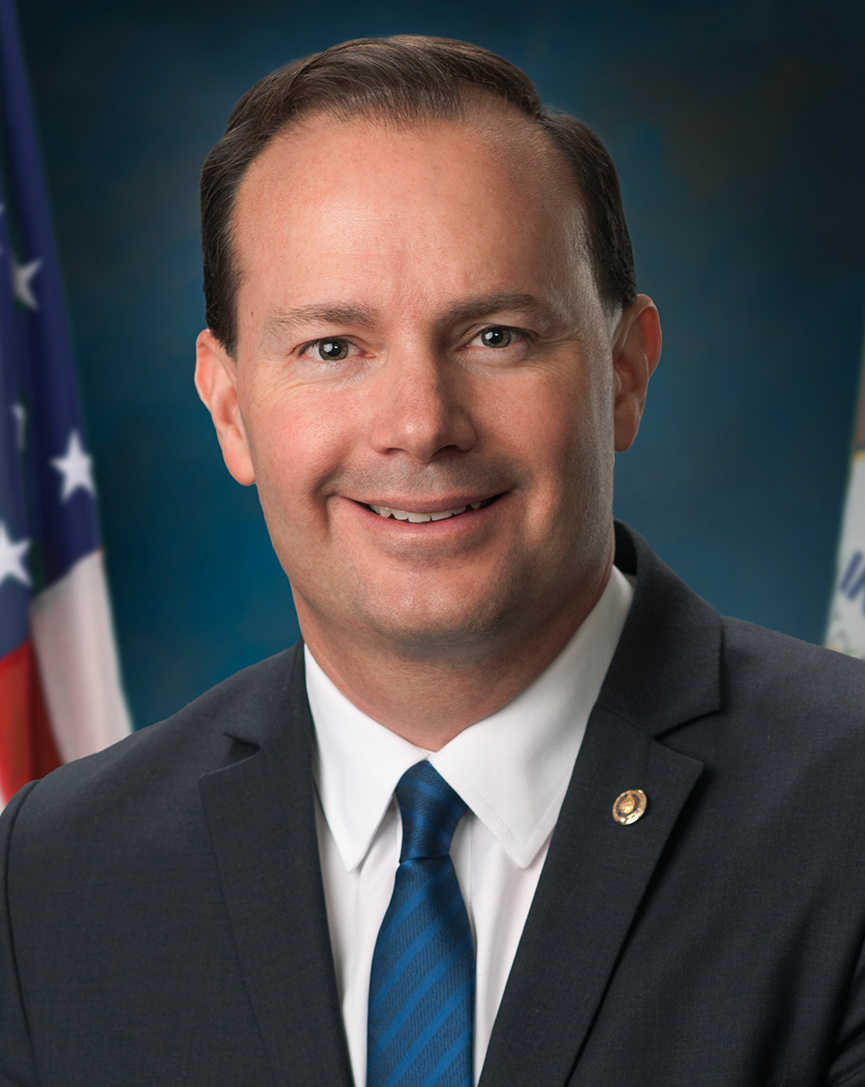
Senator
Mike Lee
from Utah
(2011–present)

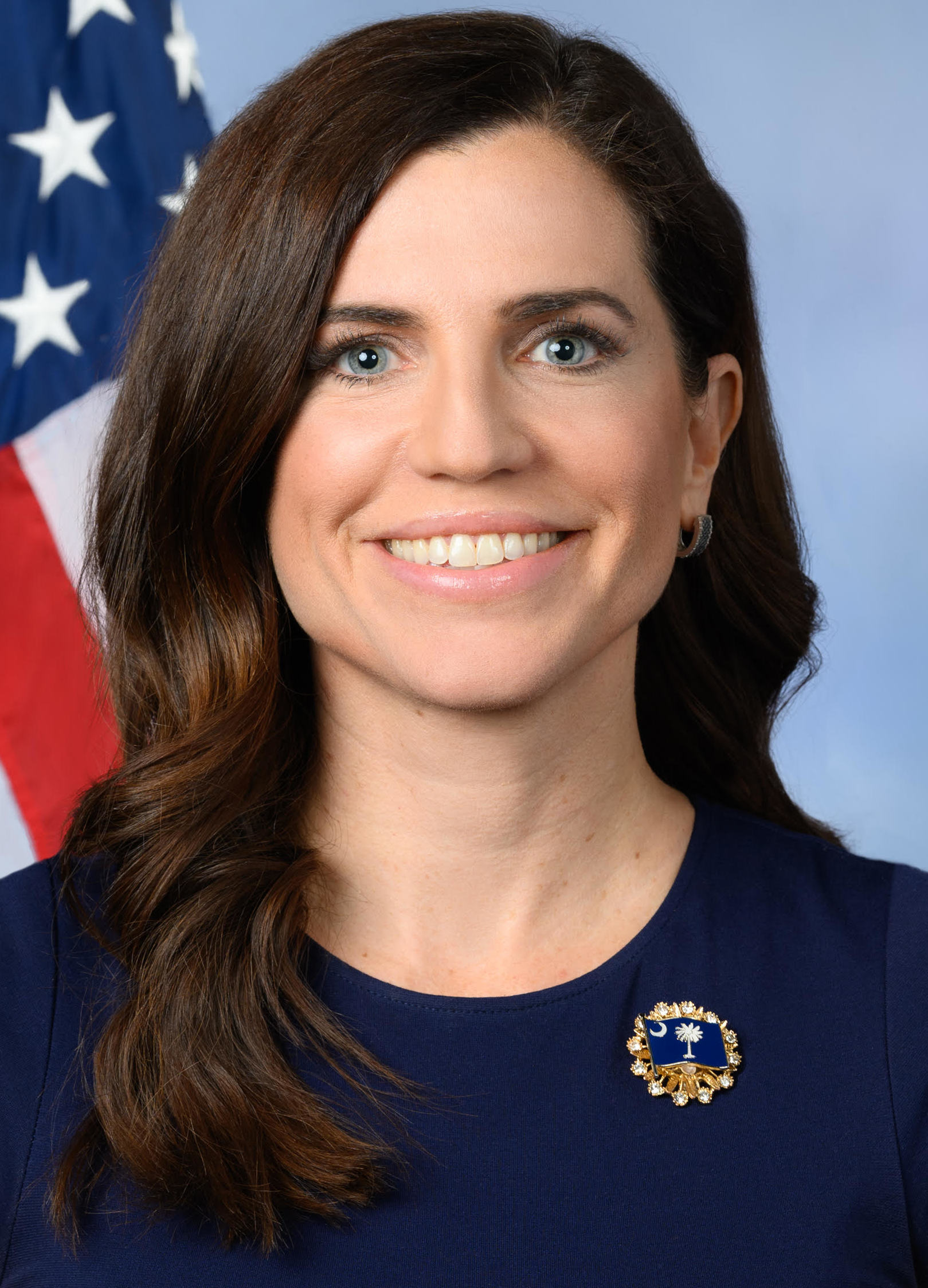
Representative
Nancy Mace
from South Carolina
(2021–present)

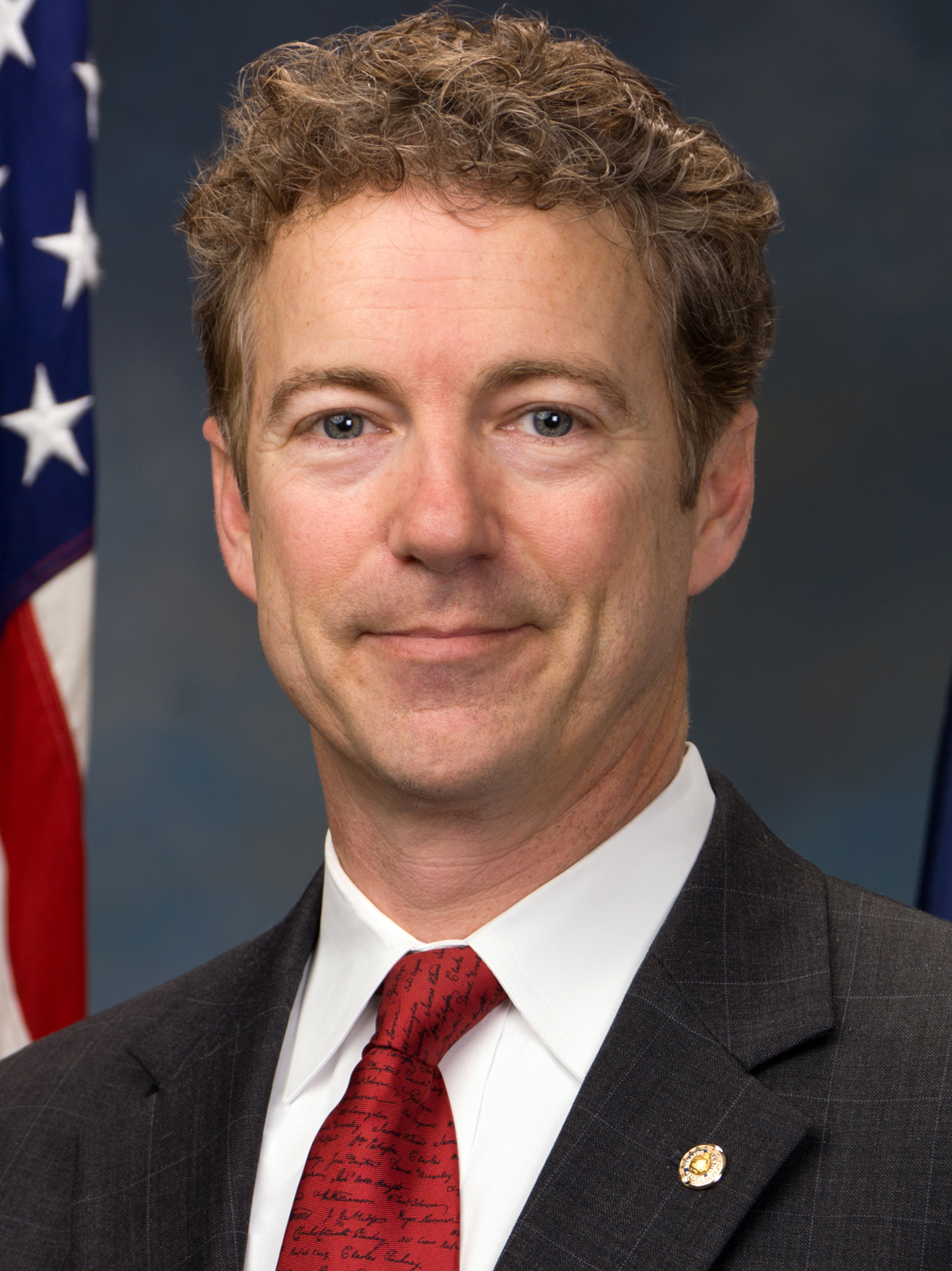
Senator and 2016 presidential candidate
Rand Paul
from Kentucky
(2011–present)

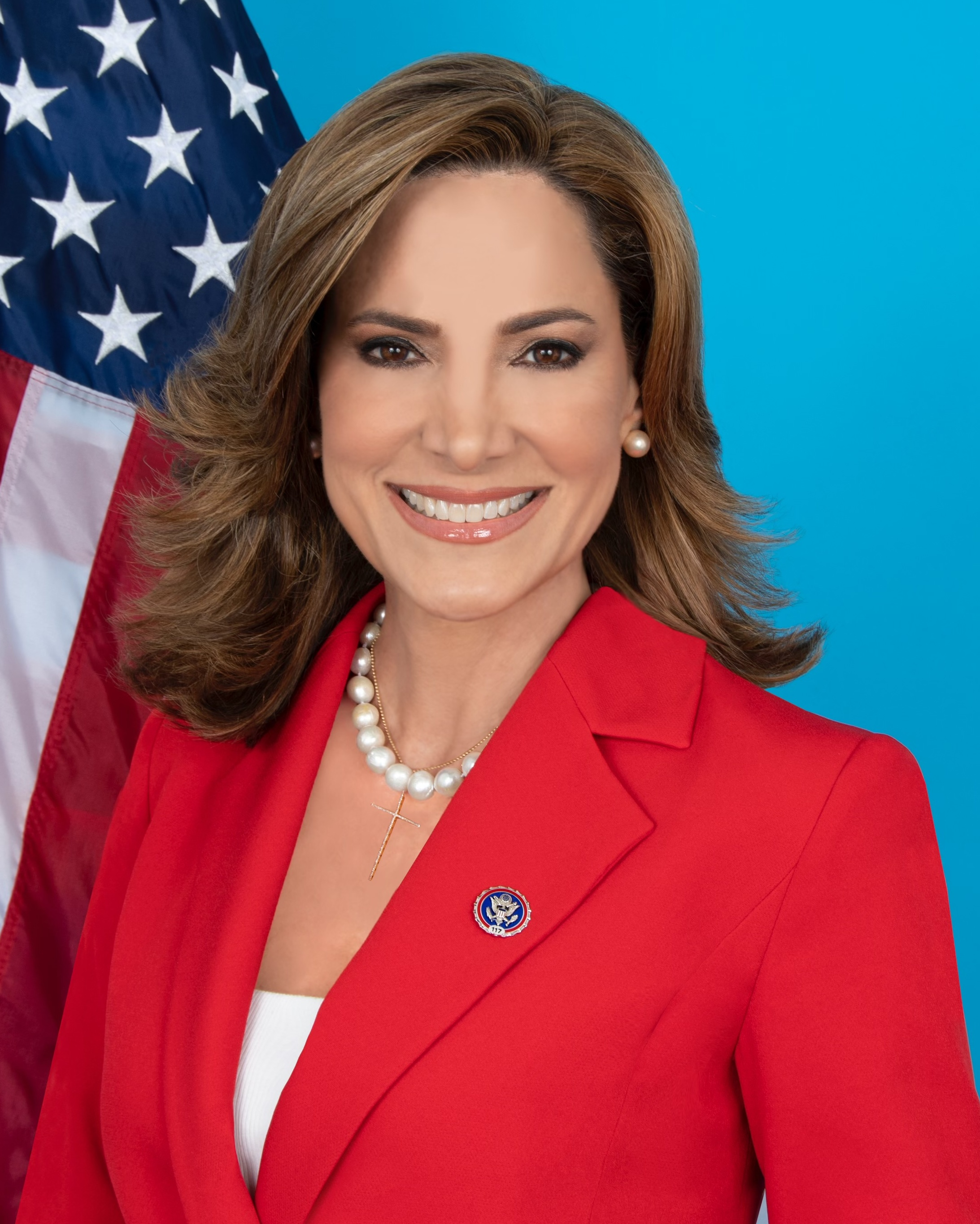
Representative
María Elvira Salazar
from Florida
(2021–present)

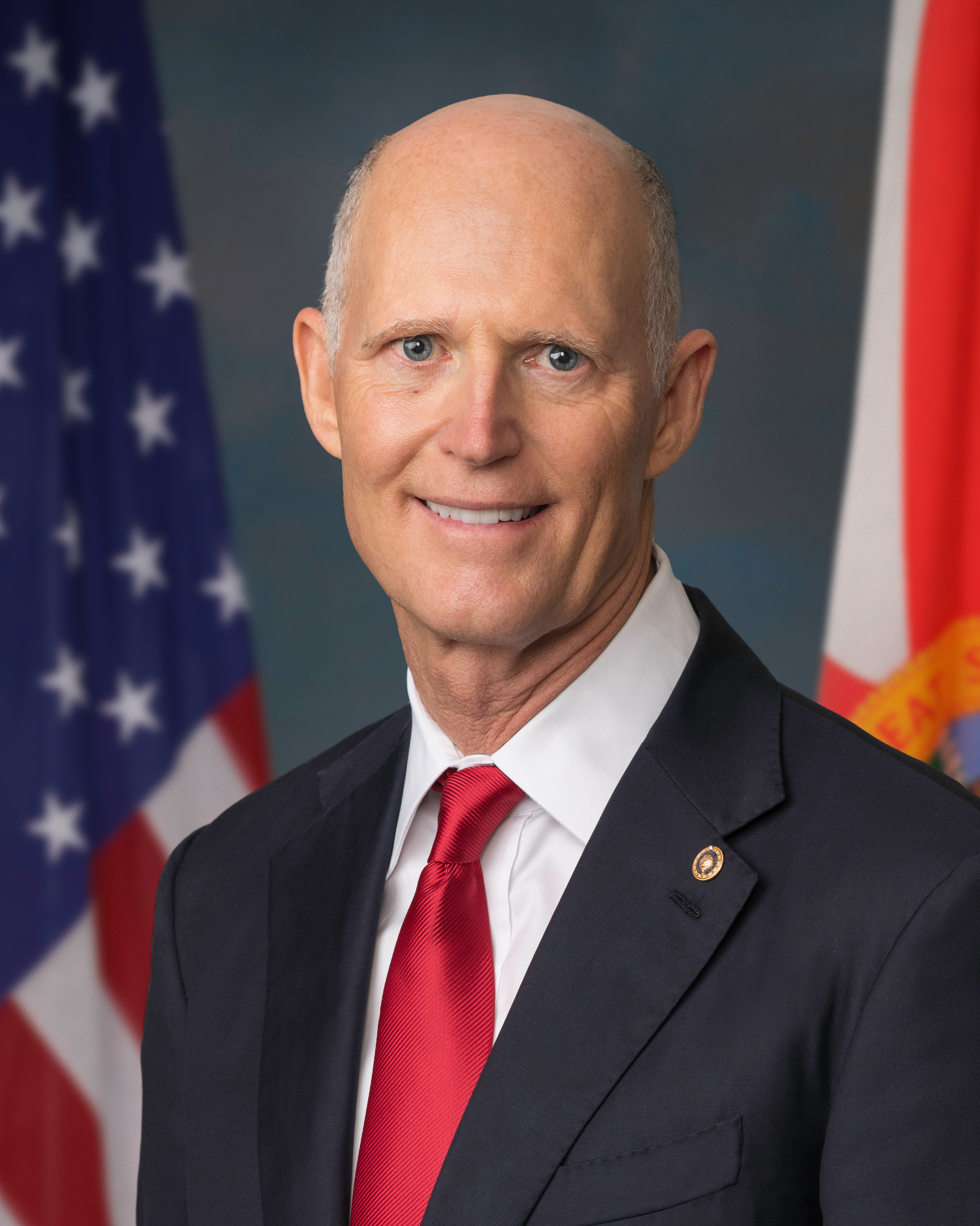
Senator
Rick Scott
from Florida
(2019–present)

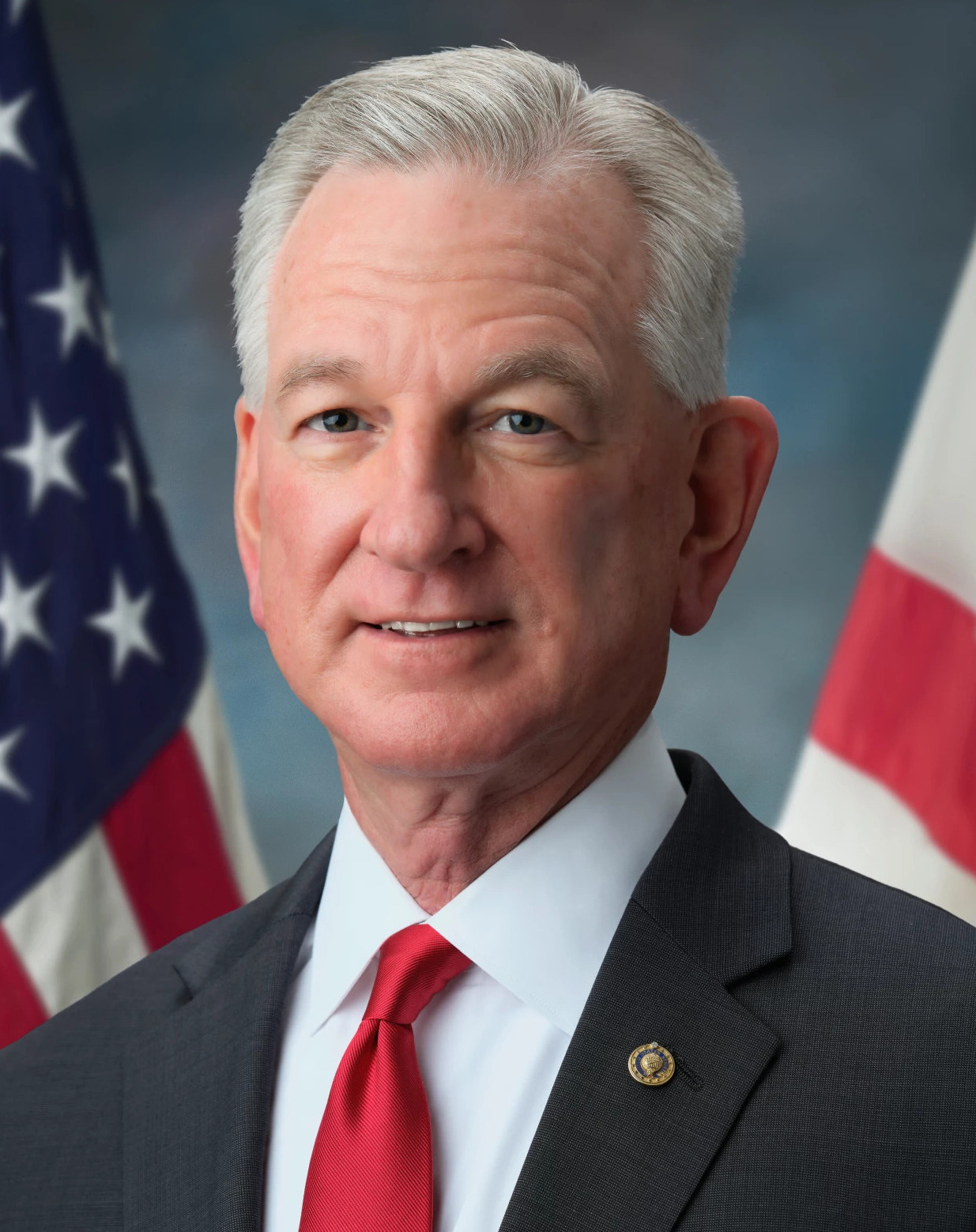
Senator
Tommy Tuberville
from Alabama
(2021–present)

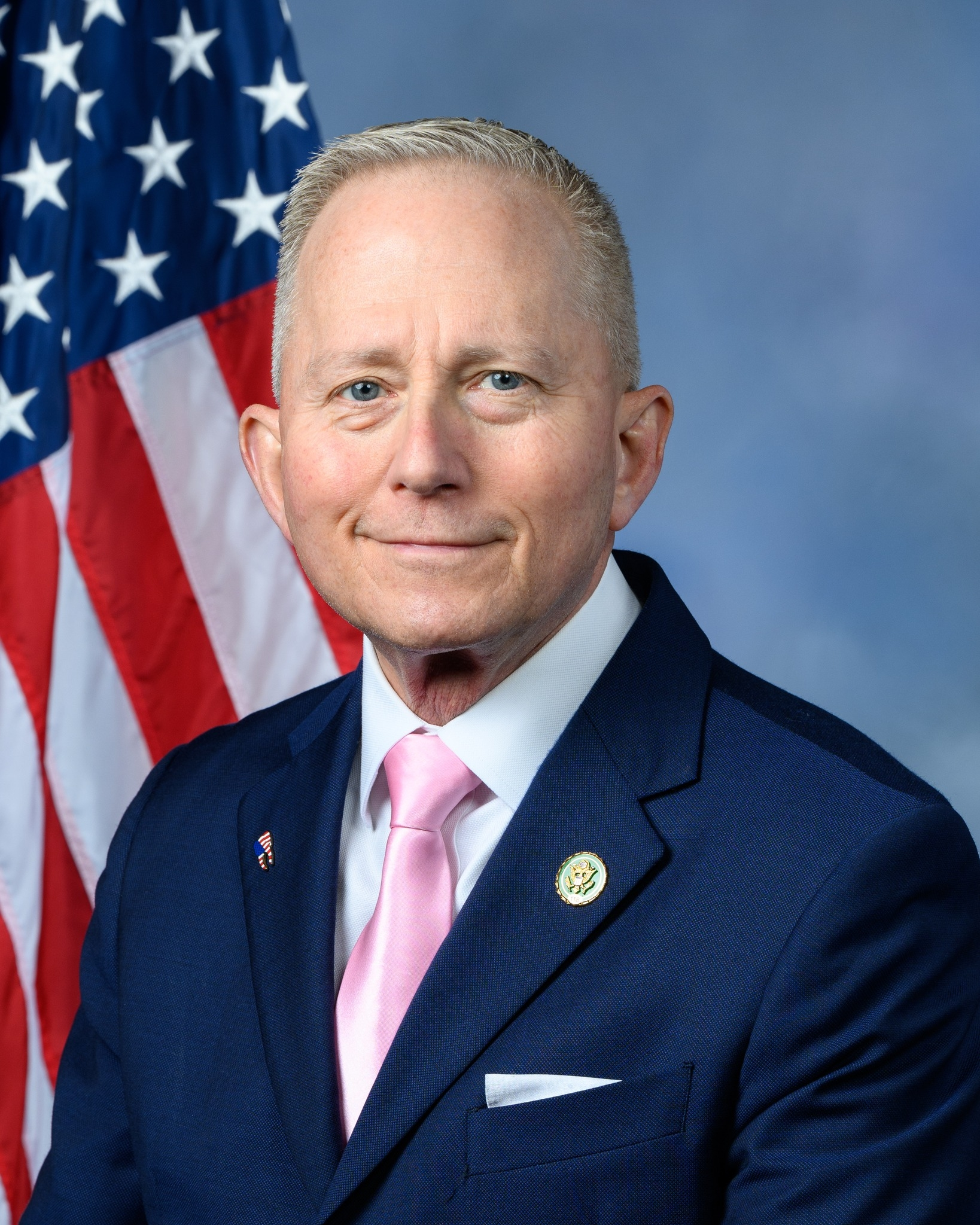
Representative
Jeff Van Drew
from New Jersey
(2019–present)

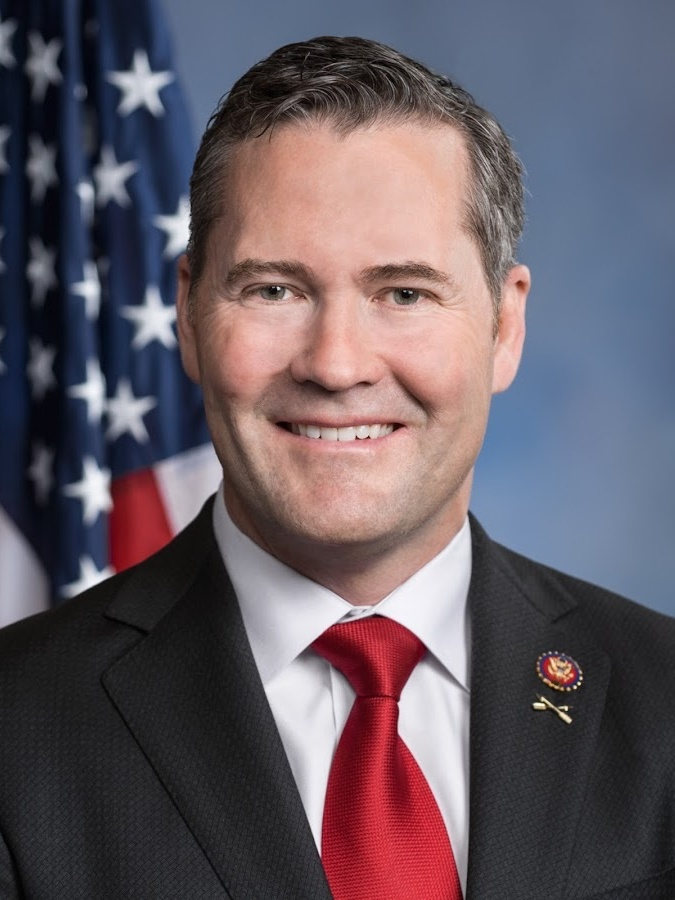
Representative
Michael Waltz
from Florida
(2019–2025)

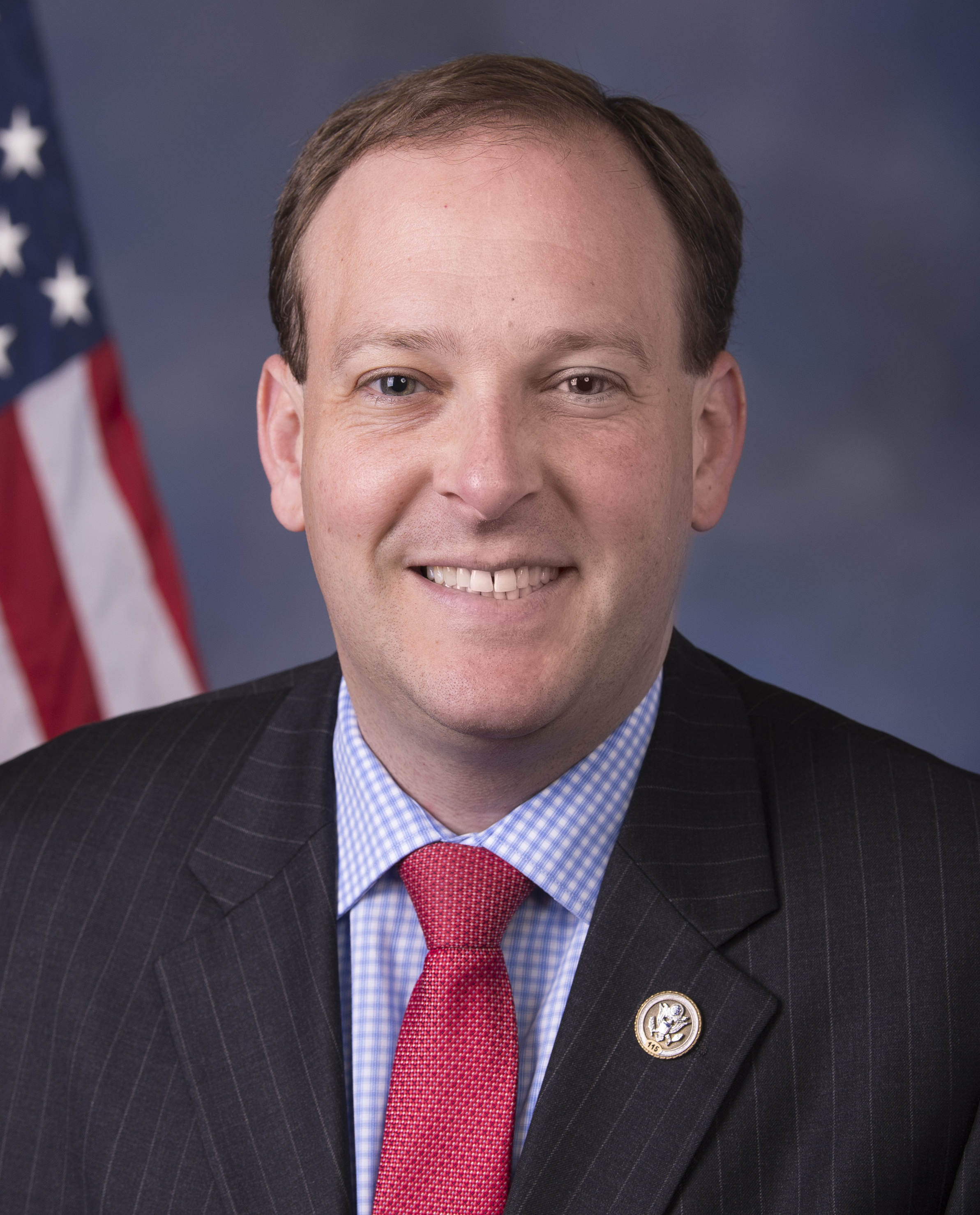
Former Representative and 2022 nominee for Governor of New York
Lee Zeldin
from New York
(2015–2023)

=== Governors ===
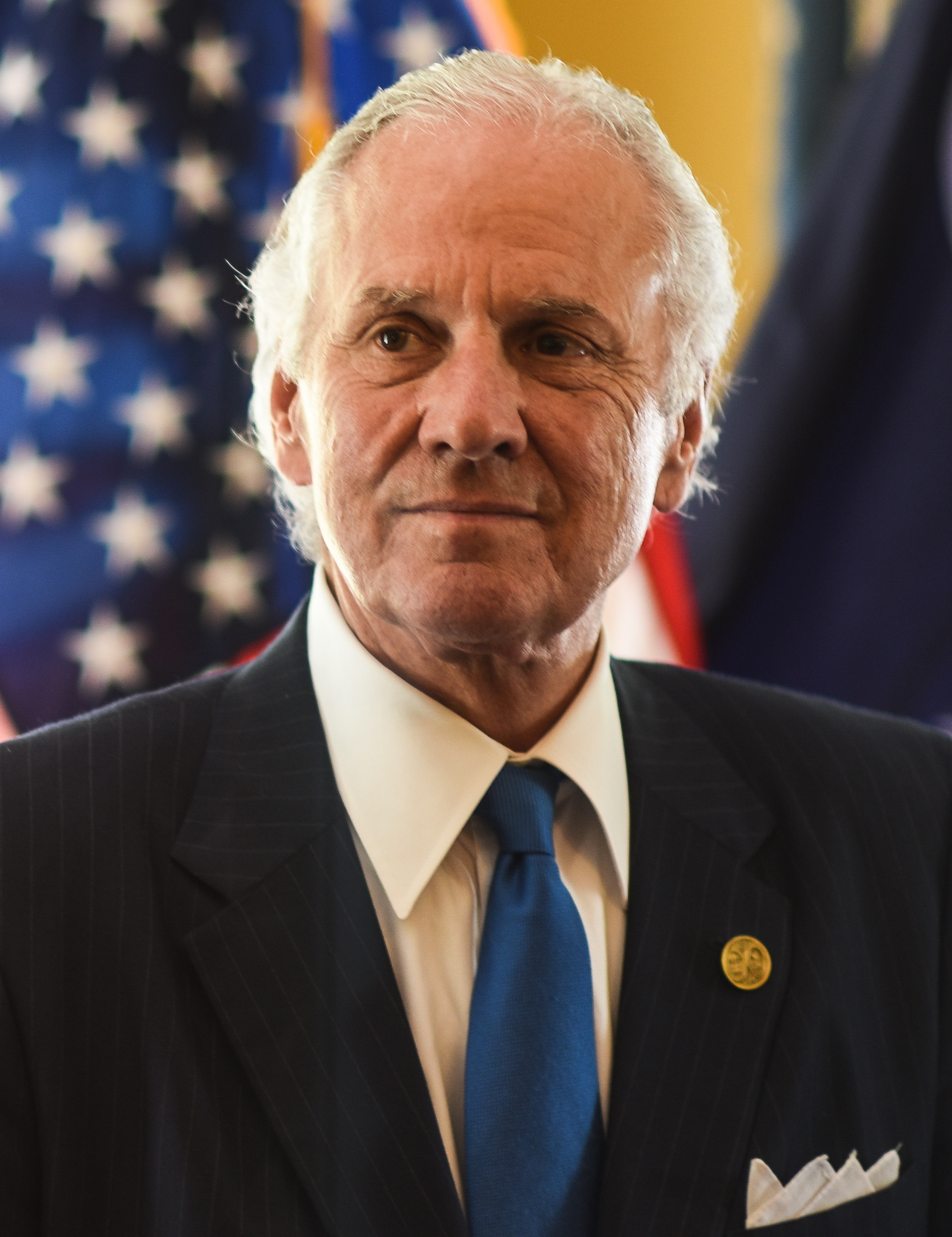
Governor
Henry McMaster
of South Carolina
(2017–present)

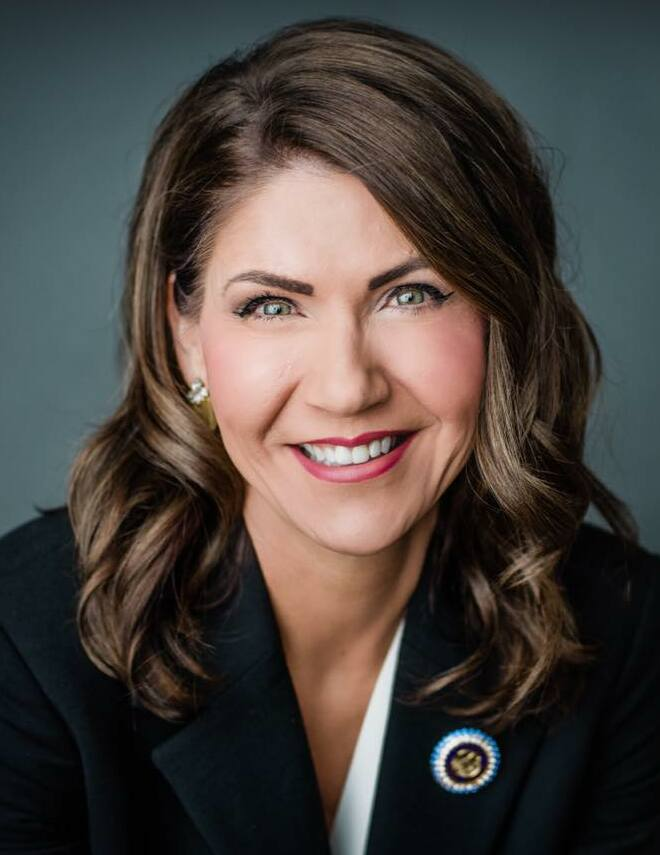
Governor
Kristi Noem
of South Dakota
(2019–2025)

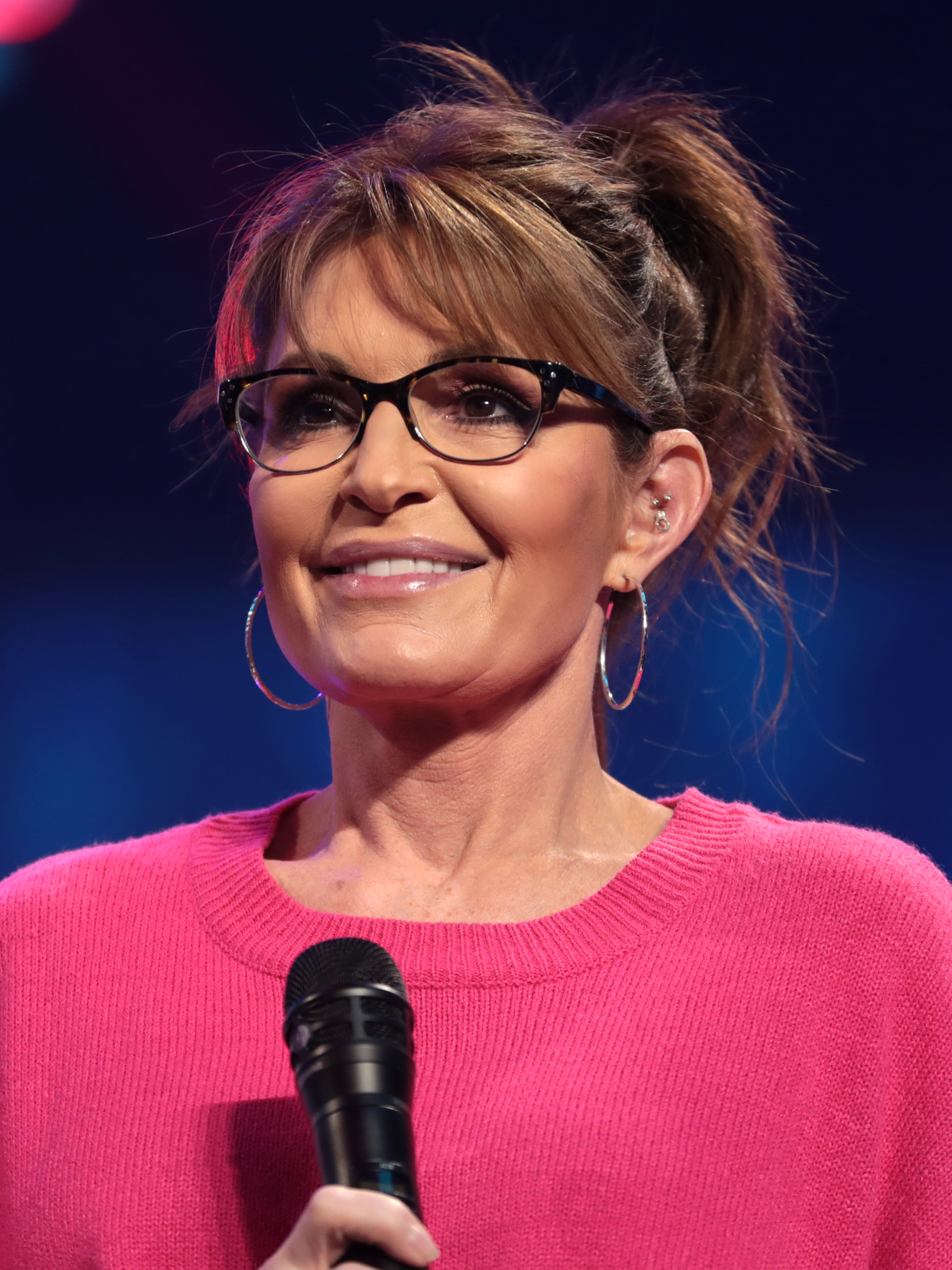
Former Governor and 2008 vice presidential nominee
Sarah Palin
of Alaska
(2006–2009)

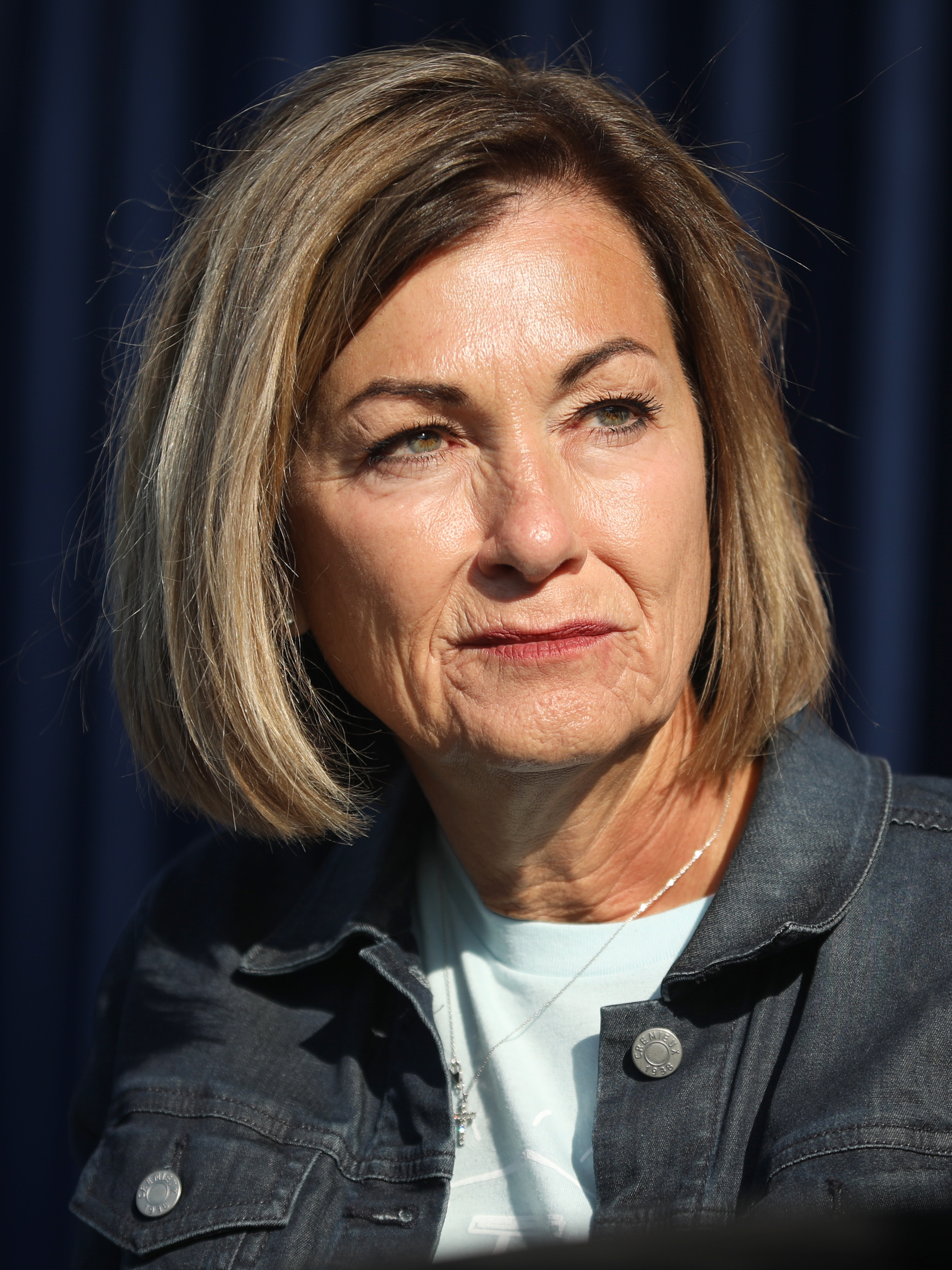
Governor
Kim Reynolds
of Iowa
(2017–present)

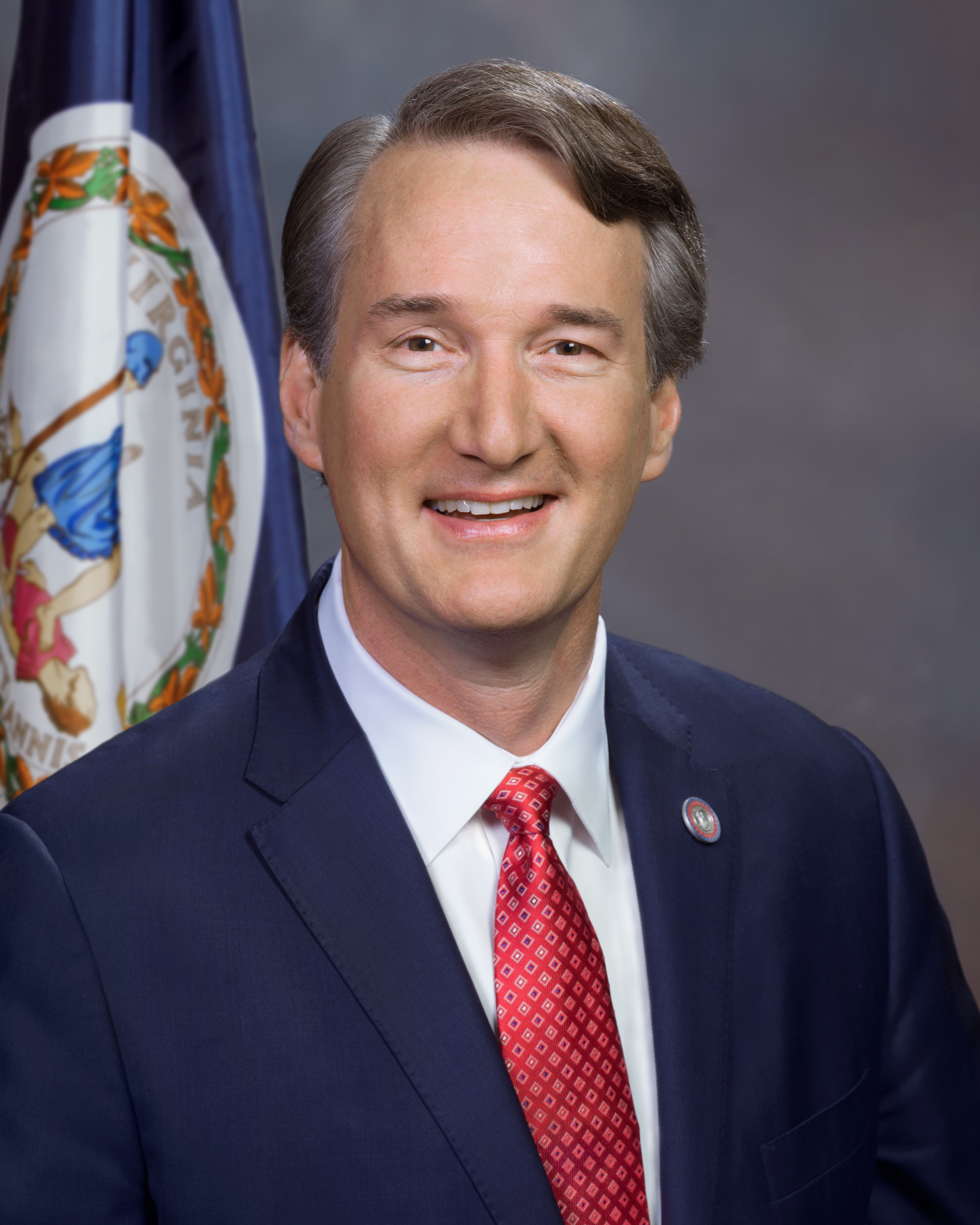
Governor
Glenn Youngkin
of Virginia
(2022–2026)

=== Others ===
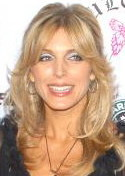
Actress and Trump's former wife
Marla Maples
from Florida

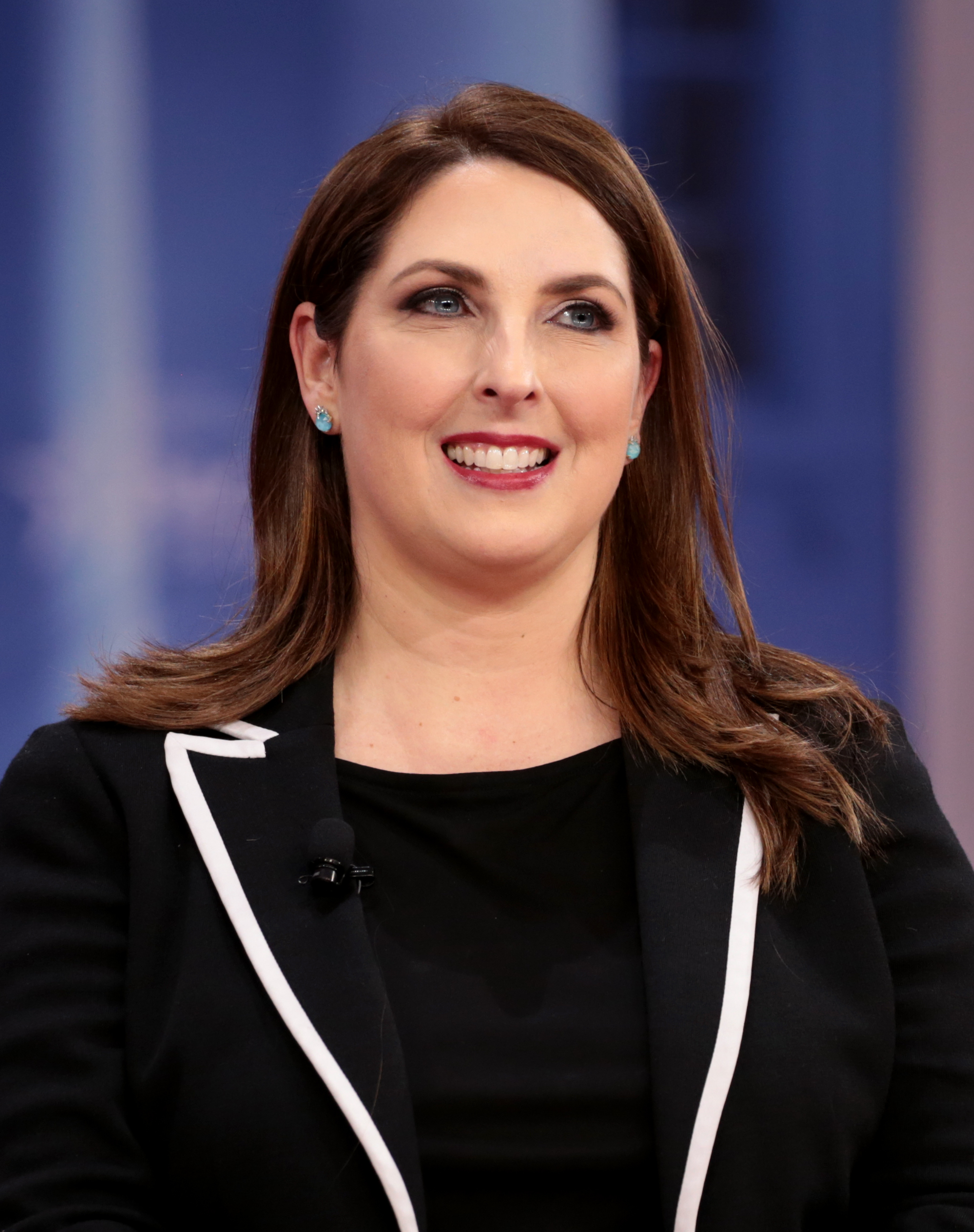
Former Republican National Committee Chair
Ronna McDaniel
from Michigan
(2017–2024)

=== Declined to be considered ===
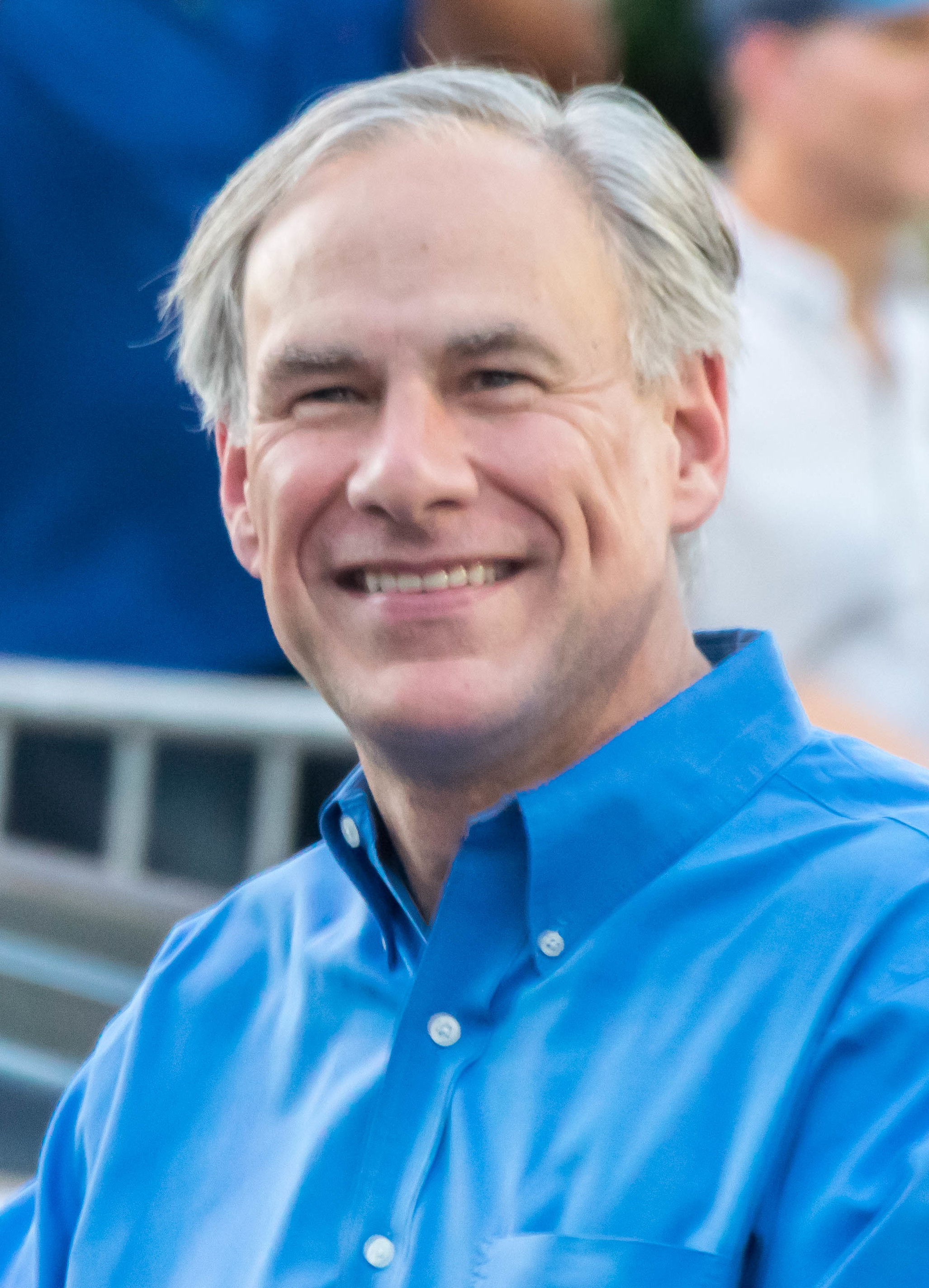
Governor
Greg Abbott
of Texas
(2015–present)

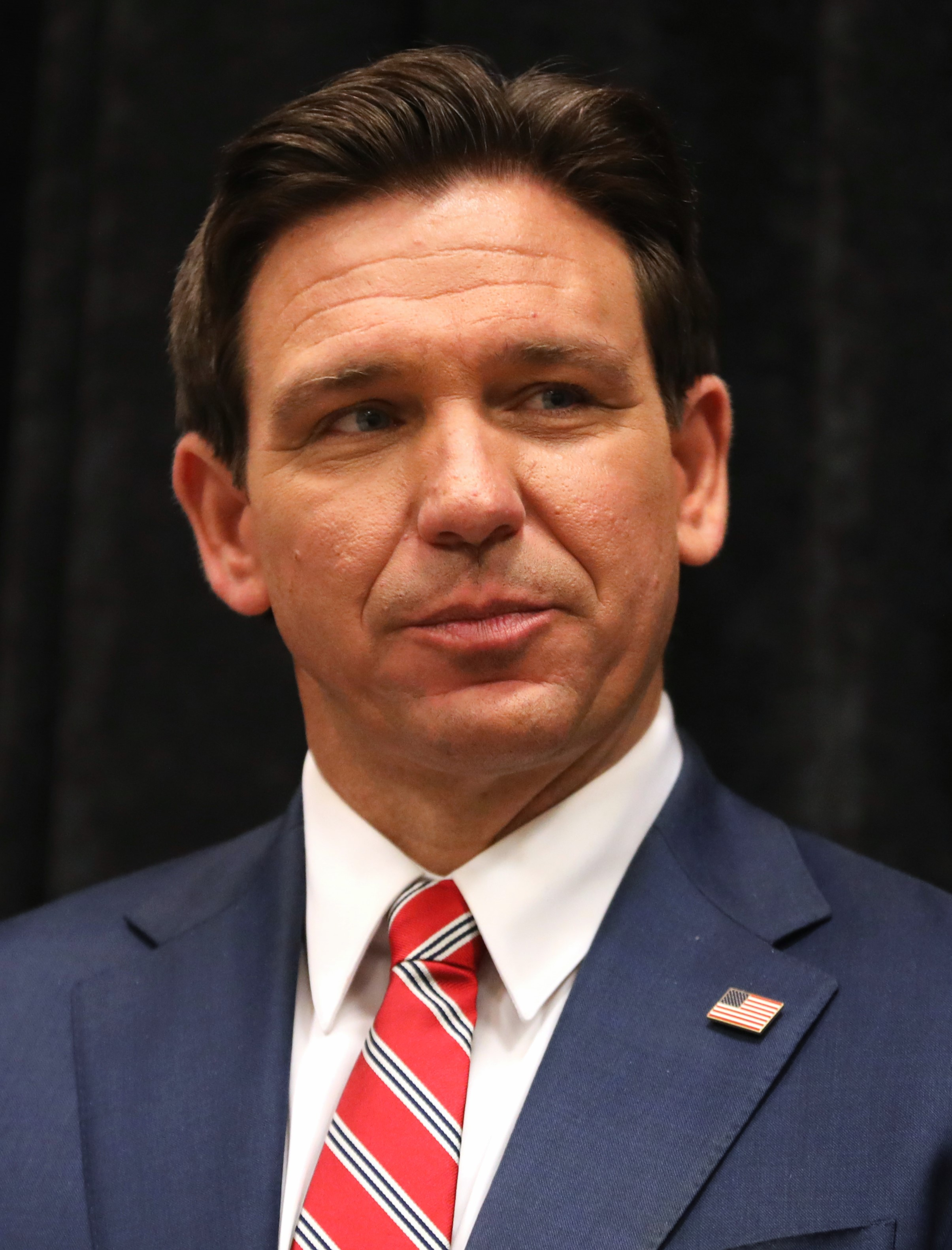
Governor and 2024 presidential candidate
Ron DeSantis
of Florida
(2019–present)

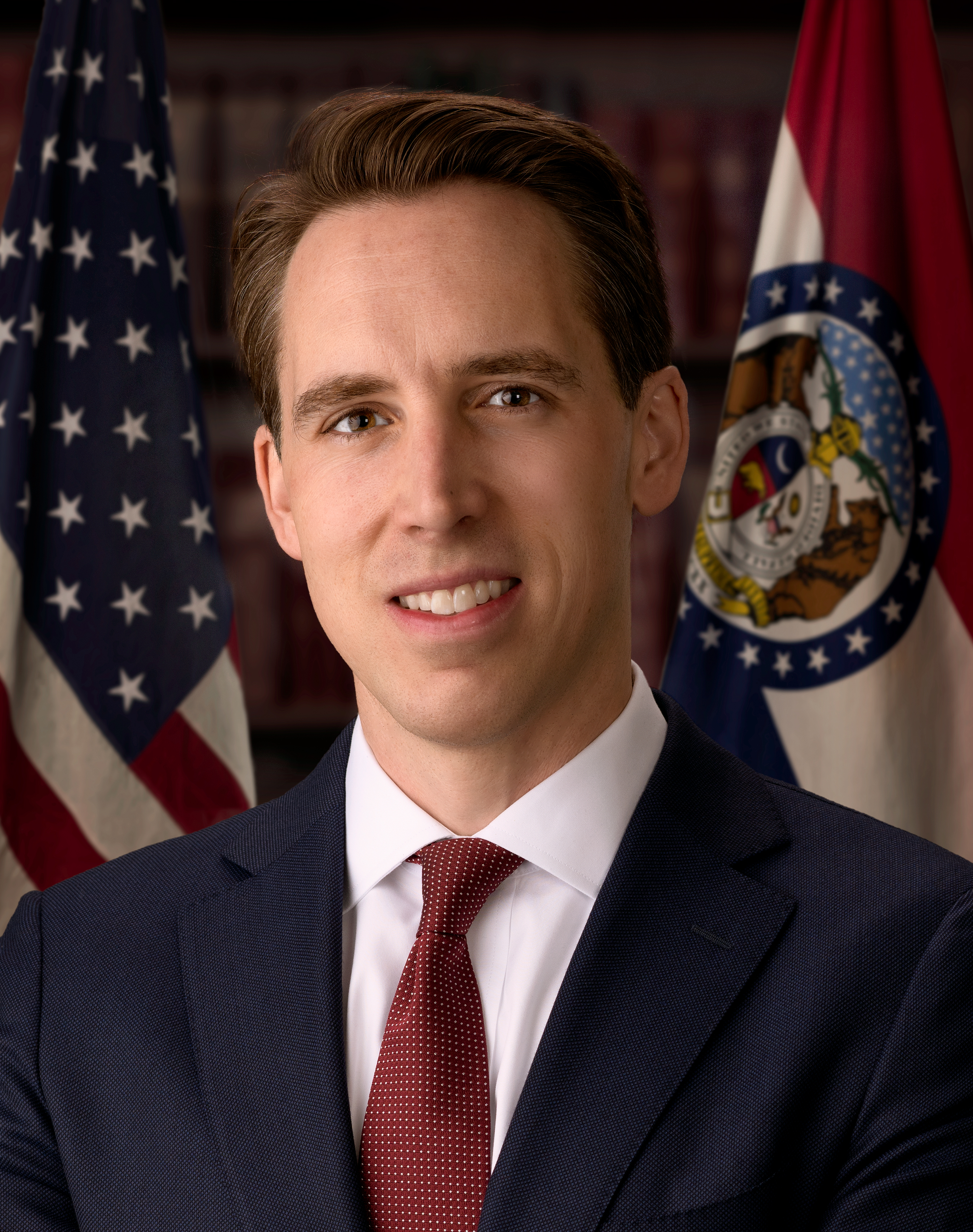
Senator
Josh Hawley
from Missouri
(2019–present)

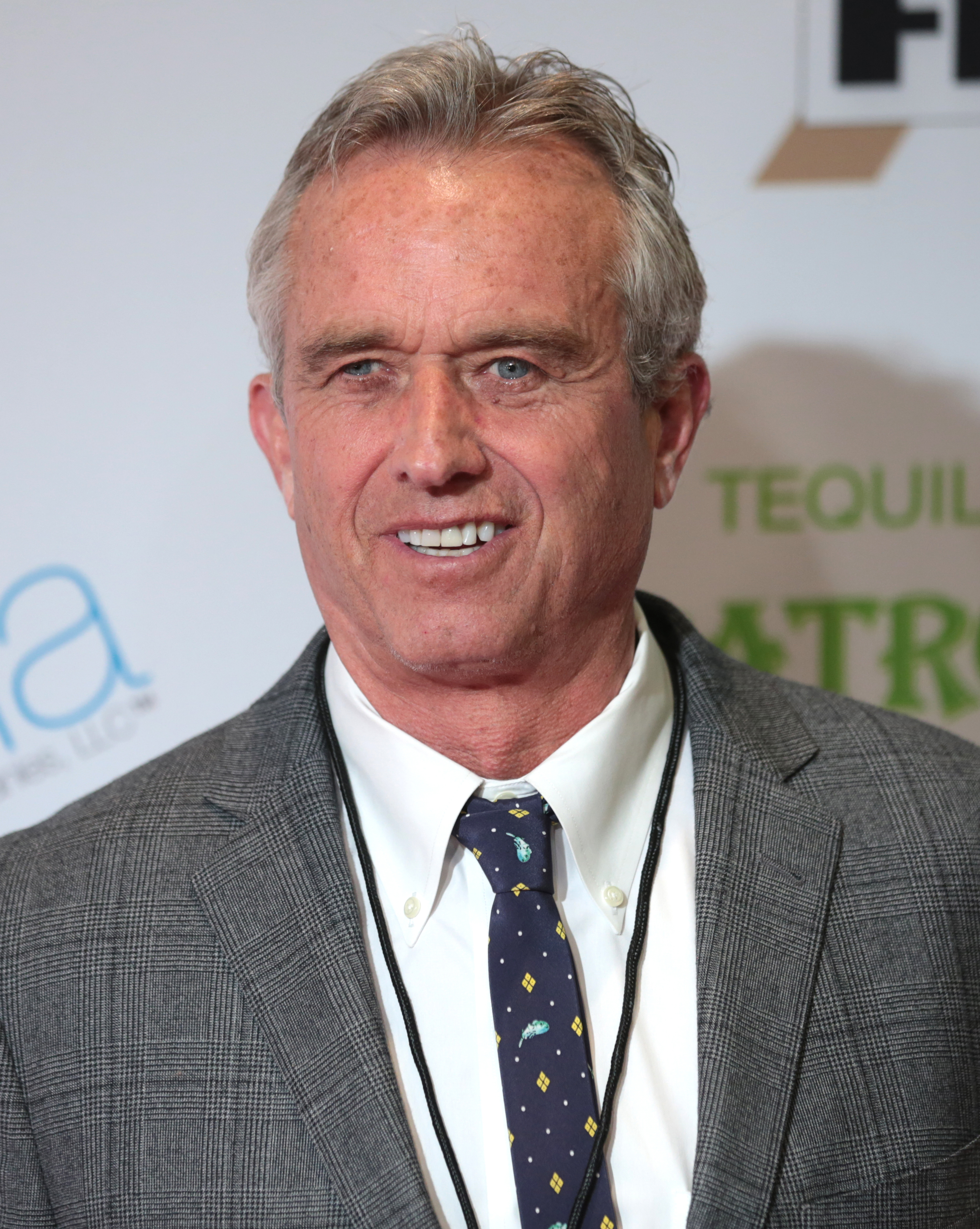
Environmental lawyer and 2024 presidential candidate
Robert F. Kennedy Jr.
from California
(Independent)

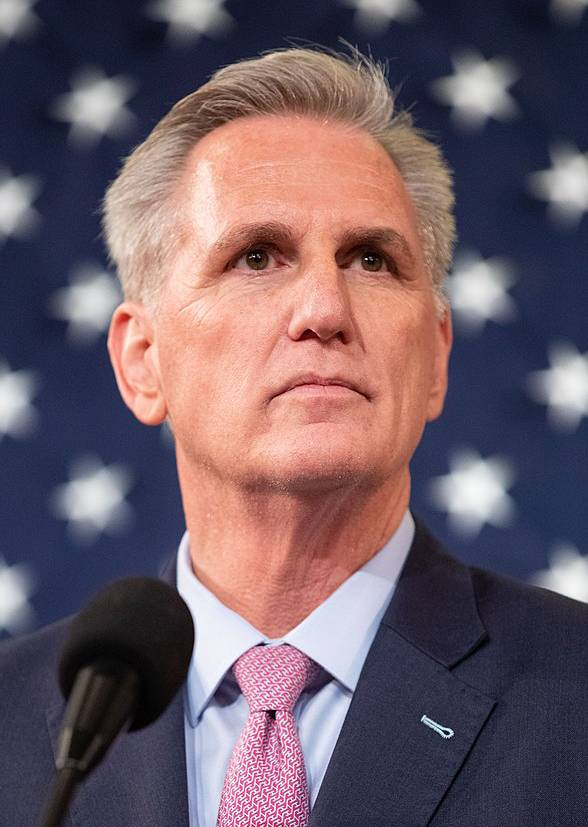
Former Speaker of the House
Kevin McCarthy
from California
(2023)

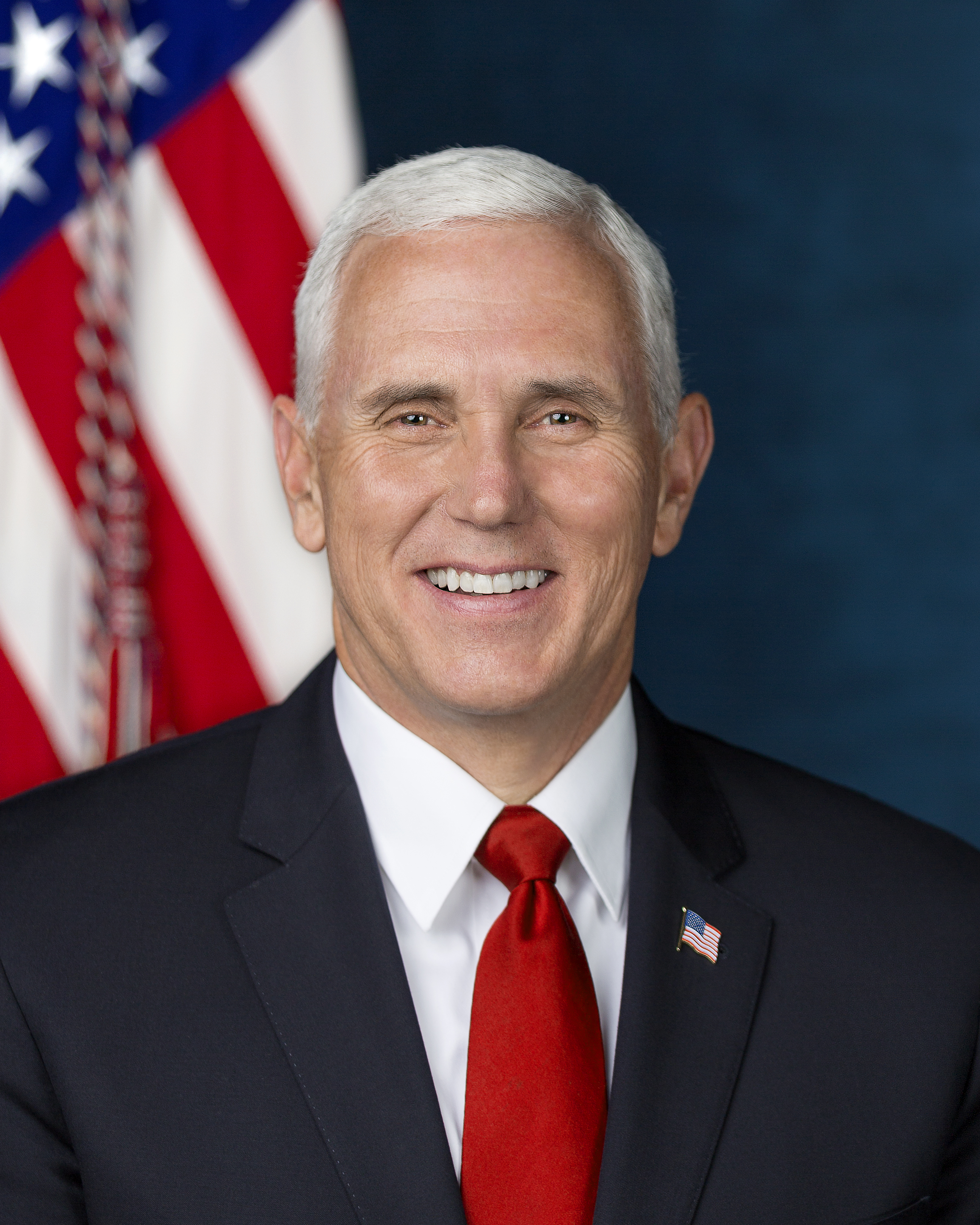
Former Vice President and 2024 presidential candidate
Mike Pence
from Indiana
(2017–2021)

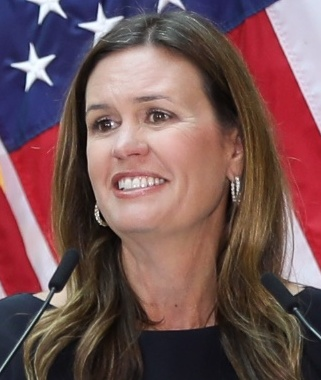
Governor
Sarah Huckabee Sanders
of Arkansas
(2023–present)

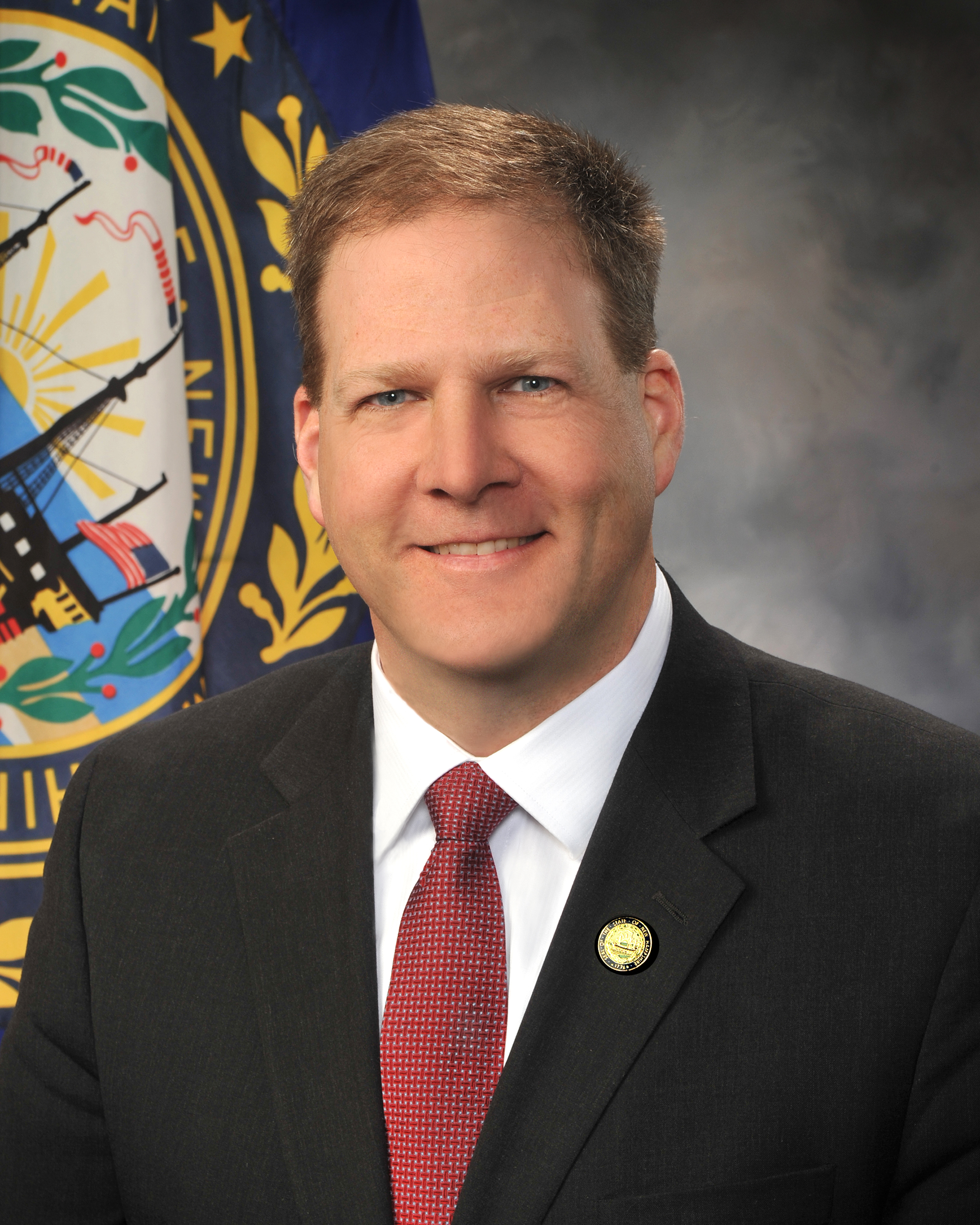
Governor
Chris Sununu
of New Hampshire
(2017–2025)

=== Ruled out by Trump ===
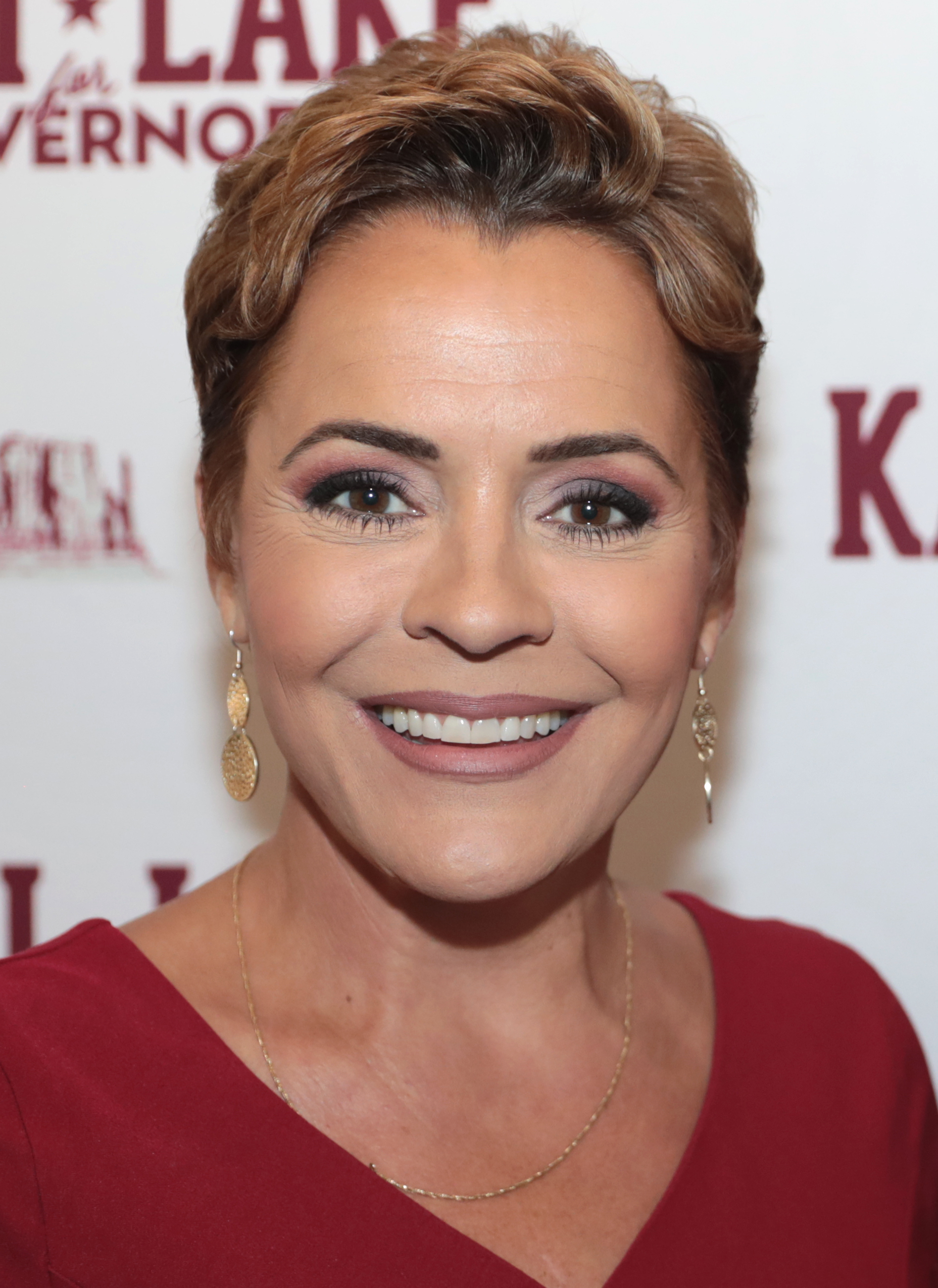
Former news anchor, 2022 nominee for Governor of Arizona, and 2024 nominee for the US Senate
Kari Lake
from Arizona

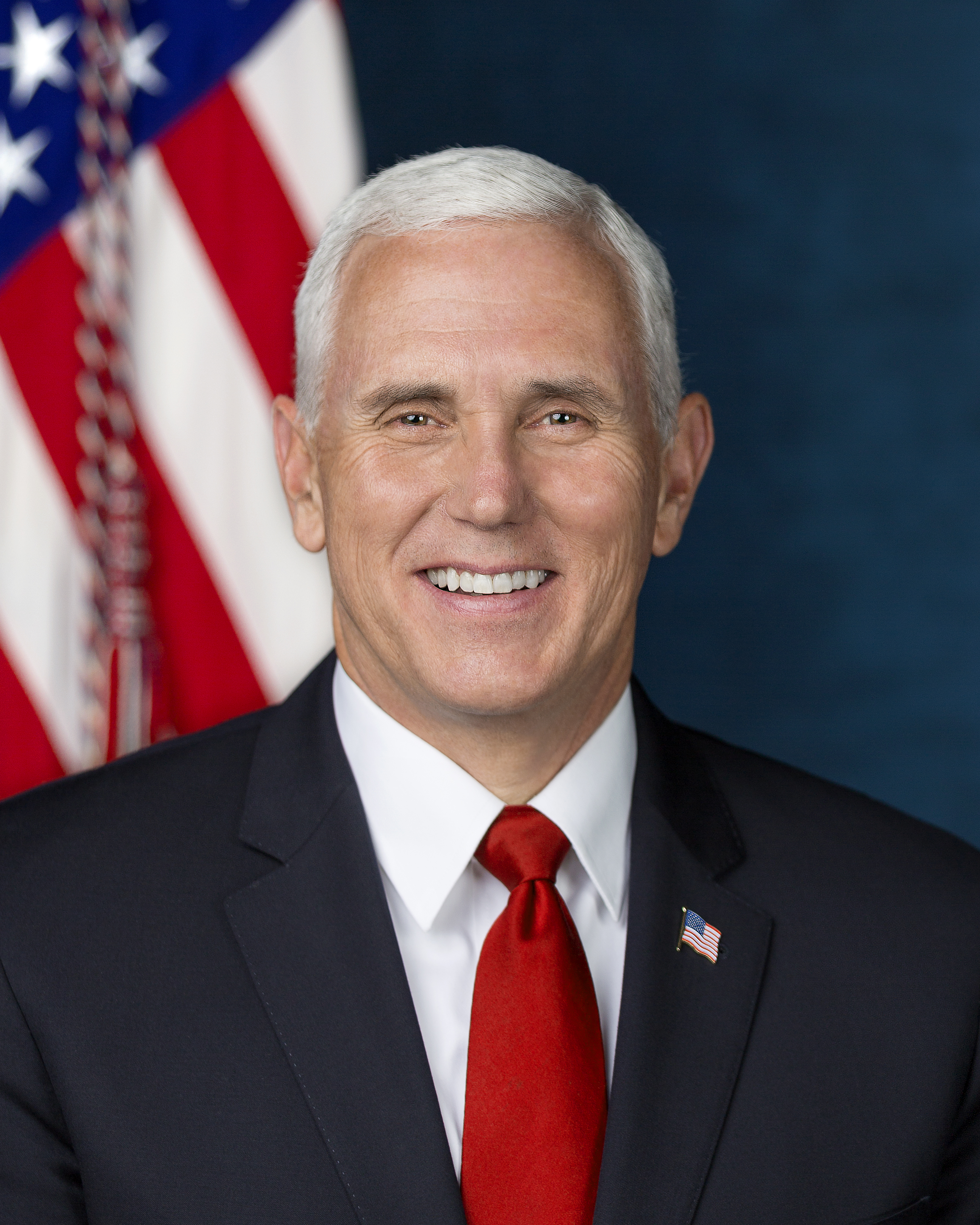
Former Vice President and 2024 presidential candidate
Mike Pence
from Indiana
(2017–2021)

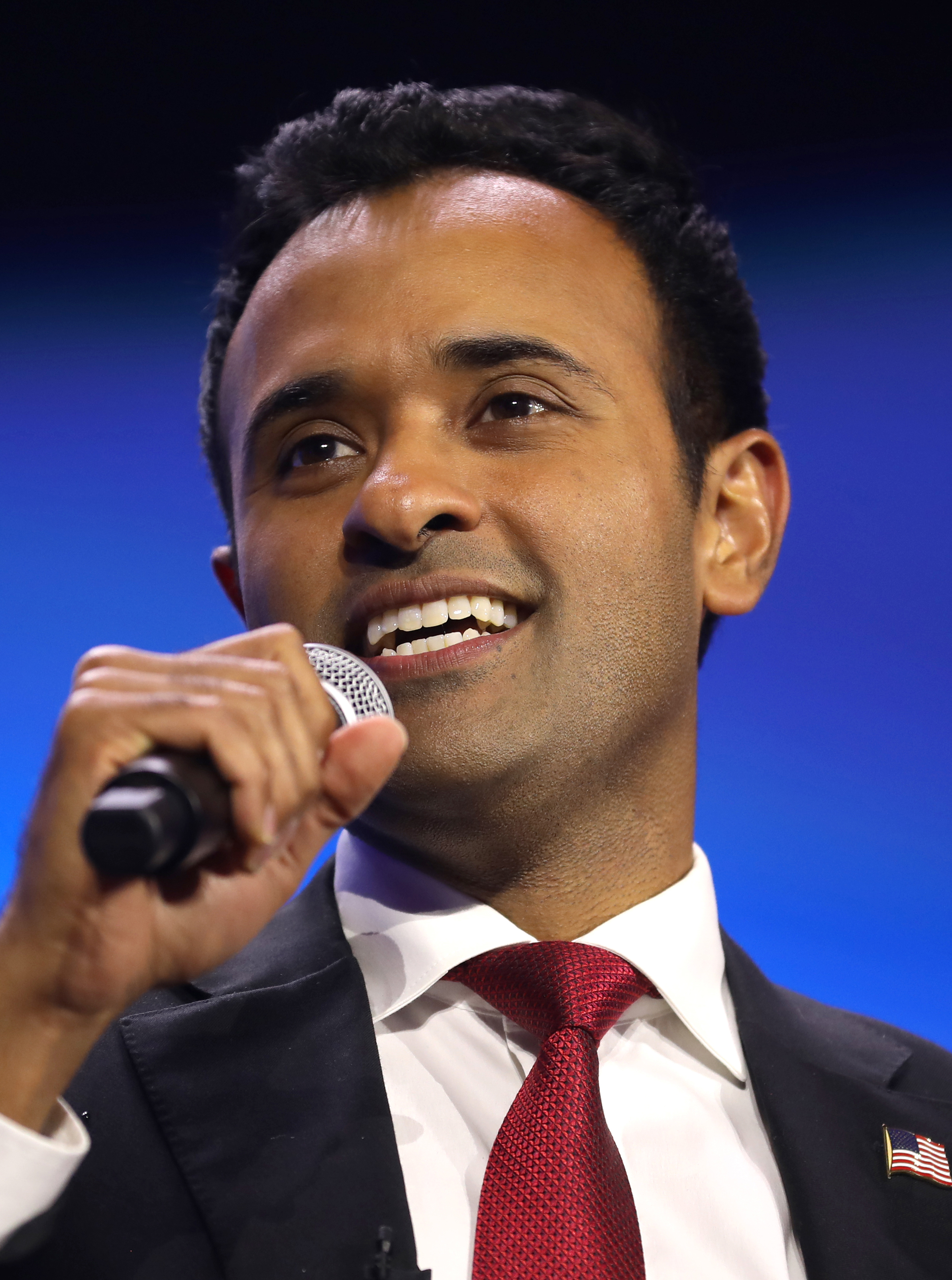
Entrepreneur and 2024 presidential candidate
Vivek Ramaswamy
of Ohio

== Opinion polling ==
Vice presidential polling
| Poll source | Date(s) administered | Sample size (Note: Key: A – all adults RV – registered voters LV – likely voters V – unclear) | Greg Abbott | Doug Burgum | Tucker Carlson | Ben Carson | Liz Cheney | Chris Christie | Tom Cotton | Ted Cruz | Ron DeSantis | Byron Donalds | Tulsi Gabbard | Marjorie Taylor Greene | Nikki Haley | Josh Hawley | Larry Hogan | Robert F. Kennedy Jr. | Kari Lake | Kristi Noem | Mike Pence | Mike Pompeo | Vivek Ramaswamy | Mitt Romney | Marco Rubio | Sarah Huckabee Sanders | Rick Scott | Tim Scott | Elise Stefanik | Donald Trump Jr. | JD Vance | Others | Undecided |
|---|---|---|---|---|---|---|---|---|---|---|---|---|---|---|---|---|---|---|---|---|---|---|---|---|---|---|---|---|---|---|---|---|---|
| Yahoo News/YouGov | June 28 – July 1, 2024 | 633 (RV) | | 4% | 3% | 6% | | | 1% | | | 3% | | 1% | | | | | 0% | 3% | | | 11% | | 6% | 4% | | 9% | 2% | | 5% | 18% (Note: "Don't care who Trump picks" with 14%; "Someone else" with 4%) | 22% |
| New York Post | May 15–16, 2024 | 1,660 (RV) | 3% | 3% | 4% | | | | | | 12% | 3% | 5% | | | | | | 4% | 2% | | | 8% | | 4% | | | 9% | 2% | | 3% | 11% (Note: "Someone else" with 11%) | 25% |
| Leger/Canadian Press | March 23–25, 2024 | 285 (A) | | 1% | | 10% | | | | | 22% | | | | 10% | | | | | 4% | | | 11% | | | | | 9% | 4% | | | 6% (Note: "Someone else" with 6%) | 24% |
| YouGov | February 26 – March 3, 2024 | 380 (RV) | | | 3% | 8% | | | | 3% | 13% | | | 0% | 11% | | | 10% | 1% | 5% | 7% | | 12% | | | 4% | | 9% | 2% | | 2% | 11% (Note: "Someone else" with 11%) | 9% |
| Leger/Canadian Press | February 23–25, 2024 | 300 (A) | | 2% | | 5% | | | | | 21% | | | | 7% | | | | | 4% | | | 16% | | | | | 9% | 4% | | | 7% (Note: "Someone else" with 7%) | 26% |
| YouGov | February 6–9, 2024 | 365 (RV) | | | 4% | 8% | | | | 5% | 18% | | | | 20% | | | | 3% | 9% | 4% | | 7% | | | | | 6% | | | 2% | 4% (Note: "Someone else" with 4%) | 11% |
| Leger/Canadian Press | January 26–28, 2024 | 299 (A) | | | | 5% | | | | | 17% | | | | 14% | | | | | 2% | | | 20% | | | | | 8% | 3% | | | 3% (Note: "Someone else" with 3%) | 28% |
| Morning Consult/Politico | March 18–21, 2022 | 2,005 (RV) | | | | | 8% | 3% | 1% | 6% | 14% | | | | 8% | 1% | 2% | | | 1% | 14% | 2% | | 10% | 3% | | 1% | 2% | | 8% | | 17% (Note: "Someone else" with 17%) | |

Hypothetical polling

With Trump as the nominee
| Poll source | Date(s) administered | Sample size | Margin of error | Tudor Dixon | Marjorie Taylor Greene | Nikki Haley | Kari Lake | Kristi Noem | Mike Pence | Kim Reynolds | Tim Scott | Elise Stefanik | Others |
|---|---|---|---|---|---|---|---|---|---|---|---|---|---|
| NewsNation/Decision Desk HQ | May 25–26, 2023 | 1,000 (RV) | ± 3% | 2% | 6% | 12% | 5% | 3% | 15% | 1% | 13% | 5% | 38% (Note: "Someone else" with 38%) |

In March 2023, the Conservative Political Action Conference (CPAC) held a poll on vice president, Kari Lake topped the poll with 20%, Ron DeSantis on 14% and Nikki Haley on 10%. Turning Point Action held a straw poll in July 2023 where Lake finished first with 30%, Byron Donalds in second with 24%, and Vivek Ramaswamy in third with 22%.

The vice presidential straw poll held at CPAC in February 2024 saw Ramaswamy and Kristi Noem tied for first place with 15% each, with Tulsi Gabbard at second with 9%, followed by Elise Stefanik and Tim Scott with 8%. Donalds and Lake received 7% and 6% respectively, while DeSantis, Sarah Huckabee Sanders, and Ben Carson each earned 5% of the vote. Other candidates listed who did not reach 5% were Haley, Tucker Carlson, Robert F. Kennedy Jr., and JD Vance.

== See also ==
- Donald Trump 2024 presidential campaign
- 2024 Republican Party presidential candidates
- 2024 Republican Party presidential primaries
- 2024 Republican National Convention
- 2024 United States presidential election
- List of United States major party presidential tickets
- 2024 Democratic Party vice presidential candidate selection
