= West Dakota =

American drag queen

West Dakota is a drag queen based in Brooklyn, New York. She was crowned Mr(s) Brooklyn at Brooklyn's largest drag pageant in 2016 and Drag Queen of the Year at the Brooklyn Nightlife Awards in 2019. West Dakota hosts a weekly drag performance, Oops!, along with drag queens Chiquitita (née HaraJuku) and Magenta. In 2020, West Dakota along with mentor Merrie Cherry, Ceyenne Doroshow, Raquel Willis, the family of Iyanna Dior, and several black and transgender community organizations (Marsha P. Johnson Institute, The Okra Project, and Black Trans Femmes in the Arts) organized one of the largest silent marches in recent New York history.

== Early life and education ==
In 2016, West Dakota graduated from Columbia University with a fine arts degree. Cindy Sherman and Nadia Lee Cohen are among the contemporary artists that have inspired her drag.

== Work ==
After graduating from Columbia University, West Dakota made her first drag appearance in the fall of 2016. Intimidated at first after only four months of performing at various venues, she was crowned Mr(s) Brooklyn.

In 2019, West Dakota appeared in Document magazine's video Othered: the queer future of Asian-American identity. Along with stylist Paul Bui, pop star K Rizz, and Brooklyn-based DJ NK Badtz Maru, the video explored the lives of queer, trans, and non-binary Asians in culture and the media. She also performed at Opening Ceremony's Spring 2019 fashion show with a rendition of “Bassically” by Tei Shi with several other drag queens. West Dakota appeared at Bubble_T's 2020 Lunar New Years Party, a nightlife party for queer Asians in New York.

In 2020, West Dakota and fellow nightlife drag queen, Chiquitita (née HaraJuku), began hosting an online version of their collaborate weekly drag performance, Oops!. The show typically takes place at The Rosemont in Brooklyn and is co-hosted with Magenta and Crystal Mesh. After conversations with drag queen Merry Cherry about the George Floyd protests and police killing and brutality of Black transgender people, including Tony McDade, Nina Pop, and Iyanna Dior, West Dakota proposed a silent march along with community activists and organizers Raquel Willis, Ceyenne Doroshow, the family of Layleen Polanco, Fran Tirado, and Mohammed Fayaz. An estimated 15,000 attended the march which began on the steps of Grand Army Plaza.

West Dakota has modeled for Gypsy Sport, James Veloria, and Milk Makeup.
