= Public image of Kamala Harris =

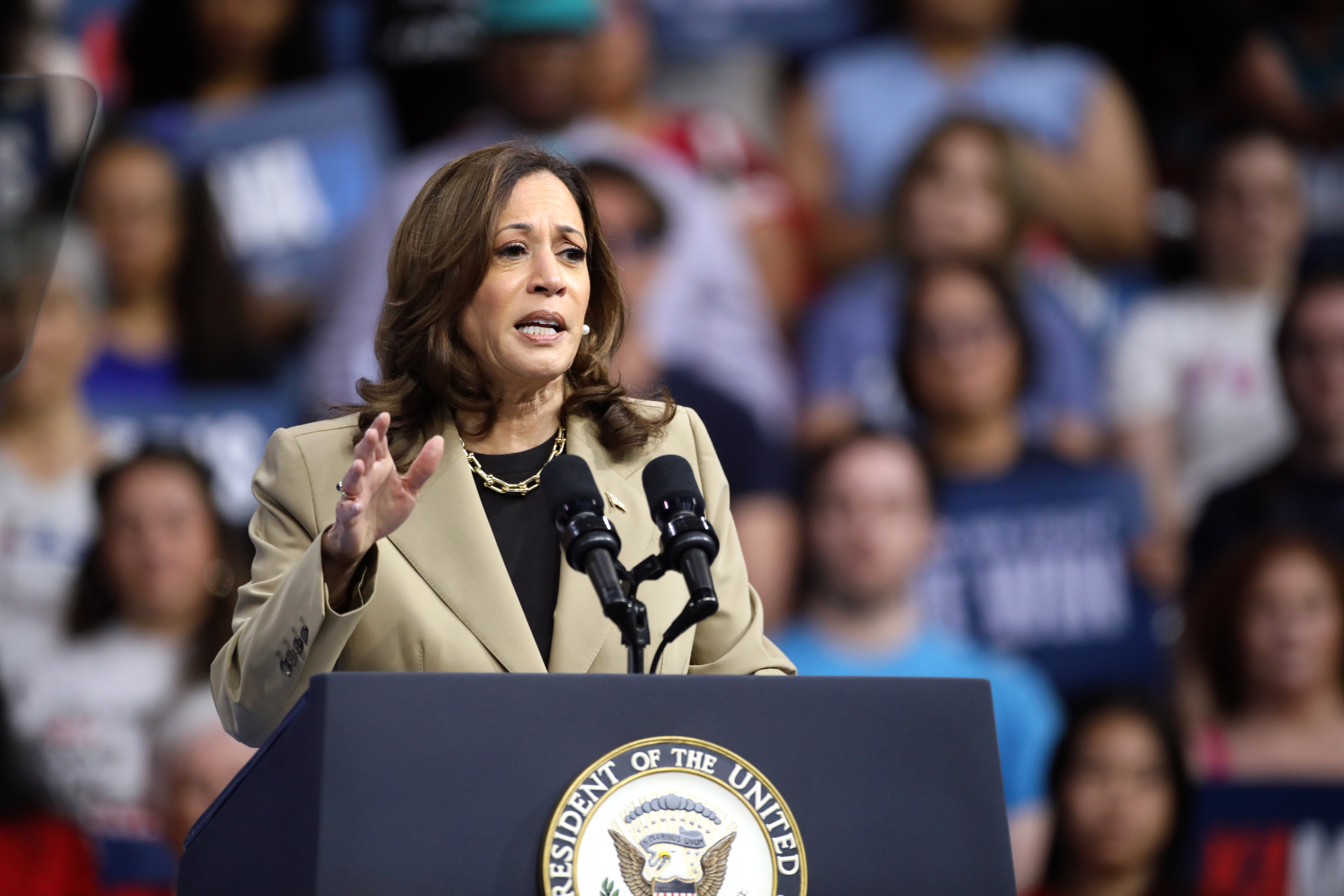
Kamala Harris at a campaign rally in 2024

Kamala Harris is an American politician and attorney who was the 49th vice president of the United States, serving from 2021 to 2025, under President Joe Biden. Harris was also the nominee of the Democratic Party in the 2024 presidential election. She previously served as a U.S. senator from California from 2017 to 2021 and the attorney general of California from 2011 to 2017.

At the end of her vice presidential term, Harris had a 43% approval rating, according to a CBS News poll. This was higher than Joe Biden's final approval rating of 37%.

== Office ==
Harris's term as vice president saw high staff turnover that included the departures of her chief of staff, deputy chief of staff, press secretary, deputy press secretary, communications director, and chief speechwriter. Critics allege that the high rate of resignations reflects "dysfunction" and demoralization caused by Harris's "abrasive management style" and was characteristic of her tenure as California attorney general; citing unnamed individuals "close to the vice president's operation", Axios reported that at least some of the turnover was due to exhaustion from a demanding transition into the new administration, as well as financial and personal considerations.

== Supporters ==
#KHive is the hashtag used by an informal online community supporting Harris. The hashtag is also a term that is always pronounced and occasionally transcribed as K-Hive, and refers to the wider online community that is not formally affiliated with her campaign or office. The community formed prior to and during her 2020 presidential campaign as an effort to defend Harris from perceived misinformation and attacks perceived as racist and sexist. The movement has been cited as an example of social media fandom or stan culture.

Despite losing the 2024 presidential election, Harris's memoir 107 Days was, according to Jonathan Karp, CEO of Simon & Schuster, the fourth most successful memoir since 2023 when looking at the first week of sales.

== Memes ==
Harris remarks "You think you just fell out of a coconut tree?" at a May 2023 White House swearing-in ceremony.

In 2024, a video clip from 2023 went viral of Harris saying "You think you just fell out of a coconut tree? You exist in the context of all in which you live and what came before you" while swearing in the President's Advisory Commission on Advancing Educational Equity, Excellence, and Economic Opportunity for Hispanics. The full context of the quote refers to a personal anecdote that was told near the end of the speech, which concerned the importance of addressing the needs of parents, grandparents, and communities as part of educational equity. Harris's shift in tone from light to serious, and the unusualness of the quote out of context, garnered a variety of reactions, and has since been used both derisively and as a show of support. The remark subsequently became an internet meme with people using coconut and tree emojis (🌴🥥) in reference to the speech.

"What can be, unburdened by what has been" is another quote popularized and primarily used by Harris. A supercut of Harris repeating the quote was first shared by the Republican National Committee on social media platform Twitter, on April 30, 2023, after which it became viral. In 2020, Harris posted on Twitter: "When young children see someone who looks like them running for office, they see themselves and what they can be, unburdened by what has been." Harris continues to use this phrase as part of her stump speech. The quote has been oft-cited as a meme also attributable to the KHive, Harris's Internet following, and used as a pejorative and subject of mockery by her opponents. The quote is often used in a tongue-in-cheek manner by journalists reporting on Harris' image, personality, and style. At times, Kamala Harris has been described as having a "self-help" speaking style similar to that of Oprah Winfrey. Although it has been suggested that the ambiguous quote is borrowed from Eckhart Tolle's book The Power of Now, the word "unburdened" appears nowhere in the book.

"We did it, Joe!" is a viral video in which Kamala Harris calls Joe Biden to congratulate him on winning the 2020 United States presidential election. The quote "We did it, Joe!" became a meme, and Harris's tweet publishing the video became one of the most-ever liked posts on Twitter. By the afternoon of November 7, the video had been liked on Twitter more than 800,000 times. It would later amass 2.9 million likes, making it the 16th-most liked tweet ever as of July 2024.

Harris has also been the subject of comedic impressions, including by comedian Allison Reese, whose Harris-inspired content on TikTok has amassed millions of views.

== Approval rating ==
During her tenure, Harris had the lowest approval ratings of any vice president. In November 2021, USA Today and Suffolk University reported an approval rating of 28%. After Biden withdrew from the 2024 Democratic primary and endorsed Harris, her approval ratings experienced a sharp rise as her presidential campaign began. According to a RealClear Politics polling average, as of September 2024, 47.1% of registered voters had a favorable opinion of Harris and 48.8% had an unfavorable opinion.
