= You think you just fell out of a coconut tree? =

2023 remarks by U.S. Vice President Kamala Harris

You think you just fell out of a coconut tree? (0:22)
Harris remarks "You think you just fell out of a coconut tree?" at a May 2023 White House swearing-in ceremony.

"You think you just fell out of a coconut tree?" is a rhetorical question raised by former United States vice president Kamala Harris, quoting an expression from her childhood, at a May 2023 White House ceremony.

While footage from her speech attracted attention as an Internet meme in early 2024, the quote began circulating more widely amidst speculation that President Joe Biden would end his re-election campaign following a poor debate performance in June. Use of "coconut tree" memes referring to Harris expanded widely in July alongside the launch of her 2024 presidential campaign.

== Remarks ==
Harris and Secretary of Education Miguel Cardona attended a May 10, 2023, swearing-in ceremony for the White House Initiative on Advancing Educational Equity, Excellence, and Economic Opportunity for Hispanics (a Hispanic and Latino education initiative) in the Indian Treaty Room of the Eisenhower Executive Office Building. Addressing the new commissioners, Harris advised that work to achieve educational equity requires not only mustering financial resources but also addressing the cultural context that isolates students from their communities. Referring to a saying her late mother Shyamala Gopalan used when Harris was a child, she said:

Part of the extension of the work you will do is, yes, focused on our young leaders and our young people, but understanding we also then have to be clear about the needs of their parents and their grandparents and their teachers and their communities, because none of us just live in a silo. Everything is in context.

My mother used to—she would give us a hard time sometimes, and she would say to us, "I don't know what's wrong with you young people. You think you just fell out of a coconut tree?" (Laughs.)

You exist in the context of all in which you live and what came before you.

== Use online ==
Footage from the speech attracted attention beginning February 2024. Initial social media activity about the remarks, mostly by Republicans, mocked them as incomprehensible or ludicrous. As speculation about Harris replacing Biden on the Democratic presidential ticket intensified in June 2024, the video was shared largely by her supporters, including members of the #KHive online community. The term "coconut-pilled", parodying the redpilled men's rights phenomenon, indicated support for a Harris candidacy among Democratic operatives and voters. It began circulating more widely in June, after a poorly received debate performance by President Biden led to speculation that he might withdraw from his re-election campaign.

In the days leading up to and after Biden's July 21 announcement that he would not seek re-election, supporters of Harris created memes and videos referencing coconuts and coconut trees as a sign of support for her bid for the nomination. Coconuts and coconut trees became integrated in a larger series of memes celebrating Harris's candidacy, including her once-professed love of Venn diagrams, the Charli XCX album Brat, and Harris's often-employed phrase "what can be, unburdened by what has been." In these memes, to "fall out of a coconut tree" typically suggests that one lacks awareness of one's surroundings, akin to the idiom "living under a rock".

The New York Times reported that enthusiasm for Harris and the coconut tree meme was driving a Washington-area surge in demand for piña coladas.

=== By elected officials ===
Biden's decision to drop out of the race and his subsequent endorsement of Harris as the party nominee led to intensified use of the "coconut tree" meme in reference to Harris, including by state and federal officials. Minutes after Biden's announcement, Colorado governor Jared Polis tweeted emoji of a coconut, palm tree and American flag. Later that evening, Hawaii senator Brian Schatz posted a picture of himself climbing a coconut tree along with a message of support. On July 22, after Illinois governor JB Pritzker endorsed Harris, he responded to journalists speculating about his own presidential ambitions by tweeting, "You think I just fell out of a coconut tree?"

When the Biden campaign Twitter account transitioned to "Kamala HQ" on July 21, the updated profile bio simply read "Providing context", a reference to the remarks.

== Reception ==
Liberal commentators noted that use of the coconut tree meme to depict Harris as ditzy may be grounded in sexism or in racist mockery of her Indian and Jamaican heritage, or her supposed lack of connection to the tropical palm given its rarity in California, her home state. But as supporters began championing the video, Washington Post columnist Monica Hesse identified that it could aid depictions of the candidate as youthful and feminine, in contrast both to Biden and then-candidate Donald Trump.

Some Democratic strategists also noted that the coconut tree meme and others were driving augmented enthusiasm for Harris among members of Generation Z, which could potentially translate into an increase in youth voter turnout. Media scholar David Karpf told Business Insider that the Harris campaign's encouragement of internet memes could foster an organic sense of grassroots enthusiasm akin to reception of the Obama 2008 campaign. Vox's Christian Paz speculated that leaning into a goofy attitude could help Harris channel a "joyful warrior" ethos that combats sexist and racist stereotypes.

According to Digital Cultures Lab founder Ramesh Srinivasan, Harris' mother, Gopalan, was born in the state of Tamil Nadu, where coconut trees are an important source of food and cooking oil. Harris, Srinivasan told the Los Angeles Times, is "fully coconut".

== See also ==
- "We did it, Joe!" – another quote from Harris
