= Allison Reese =

American comedian (born 1992)

- Born: April 2, 1992 (age 34)

Comedy career
- Genres: Sketch; impressions
- Subject: Kamala Harris
- Website: allisonreese.com

Allison Reese (born April 2, 1992) is an American comedian best known for her impressions of Kamala Harris. She has performed with various troupes in Chicago and Los Angeles, starting her Harris impressions in 2019. These impressions have become increasingly popular on social media, especially due to Harris's 2024 presidential campaign.

== Early and personal life ==
Allison Reese was born on April 2, 1992, as the third of five children, and she grew up in Mesa, Arizona. She is lesbian and has a wife named Allie, and she describes herself as "a half-Black woman". Reese moved to Los Angeles to pursue her entertainment career. Soon after this, at the age of 22, she came out as lesbian through a group text message to her parents, who were both supportive of her sexuality. She attributed the ease of sharing her sexuality with them to her older sister, who had previously come out as lesbian.

== Comedy career ==
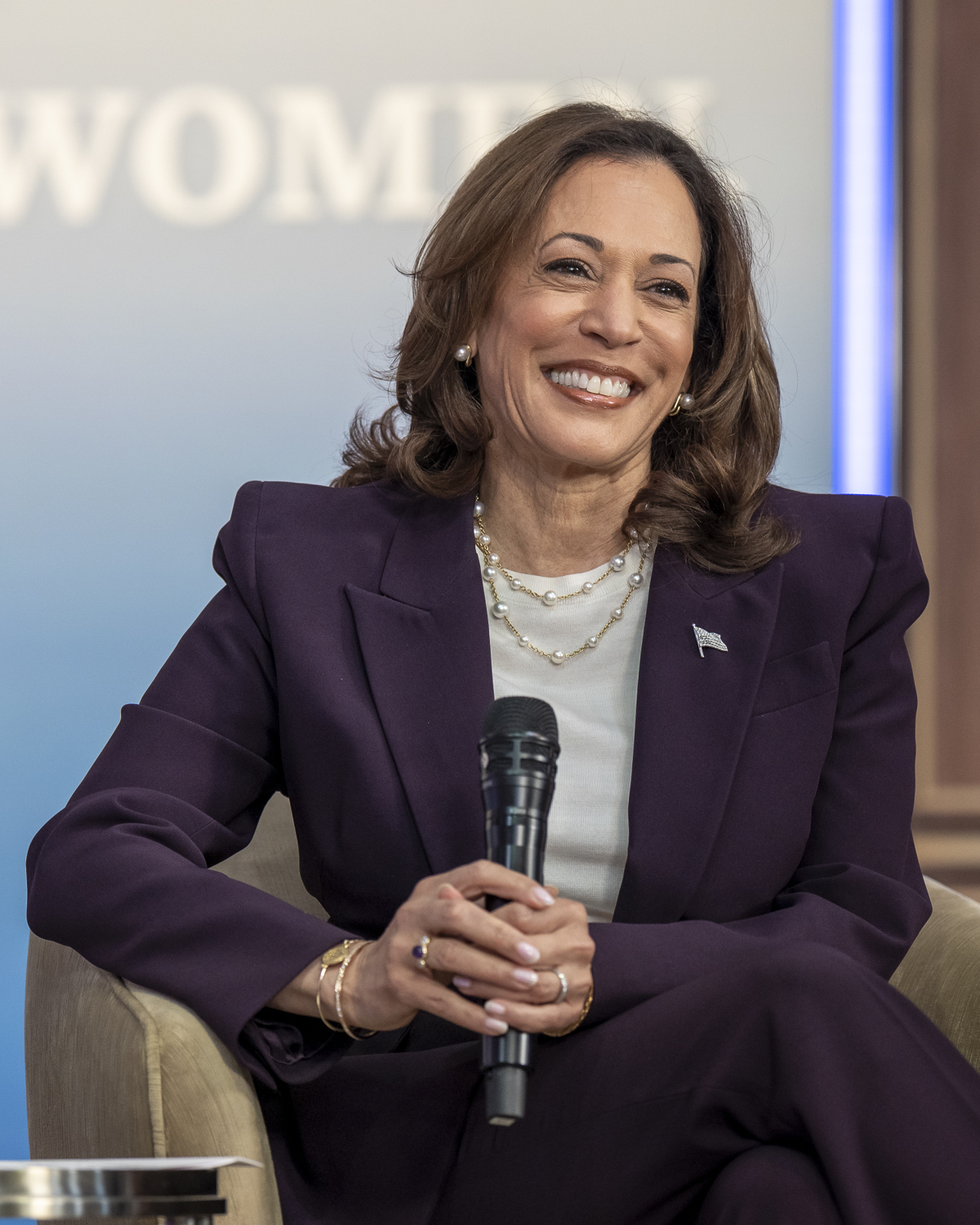
Kamala Harris, of whom Reese is known for impressions, in June 2024

Reese practiced comedy in Chicago with The Second City, the Annoyance Theatre, and iO Chicago, as well as in Los Angeles with iO West and the Upright Citizens Brigade. She was selected to participate in ViacomCBS's Showcase 2022 event, an hour of sketch comedy filmed in Los Angeles and premiered in February. In September 2022, she was also shown with a brief cameo appearance in the romantic comedy film Bros. Reese first began her impressions of Kamala Harris in the summer of 2019 by auditioning for a role as Harris at a Saturday Night Live (SNL) showcase. During this time, Harris served as a United States senator from California and was campaigning for her presidency. Reese did not receive the role, which was instead played by Maya Rudolph.

In 2021, Reese began sharing videos of her Harris impressions on social media, namely TikTok. That year, Harris became the 49th vice president of the United States under the presidency of Joe Biden. Reese's videos have included her as Harris responding to the indictments against Donald Trump and Harris's rhetorical question, "You think you just fell out of a coconut tree?" Some of her videos have received millions of views. On July 21, 2024, Biden withdrew from the 2024 presidential election, leading to Harris's second presidential campaign and an increase in popularity for Reese. In an interview with Erin Burnett OutFront, Reese said in response to these events, "It's go time. Let's do this. Let's make content."

In describing her impression of Harris, Reese has emphasized the need to adapt to her individual mannerisms, cadence, diction, laugh, and tone, namely Harris's slightly nasal voice with a vocal fry register. Reese has said Harris's laugh was the most difficult part of the impression to master. People have given mixed responses to Reese's impressions of Harris, ranging from comments that she is "better at Kamala than Kamala is" to arguments that Reese has diminished Harris's intelligence. Reese also hosts a podcast called The N'Kay Hour, in which she does an impression of Harris hosting a comedy show.
