= T Boy Wrestling =

Transgender wrestling event

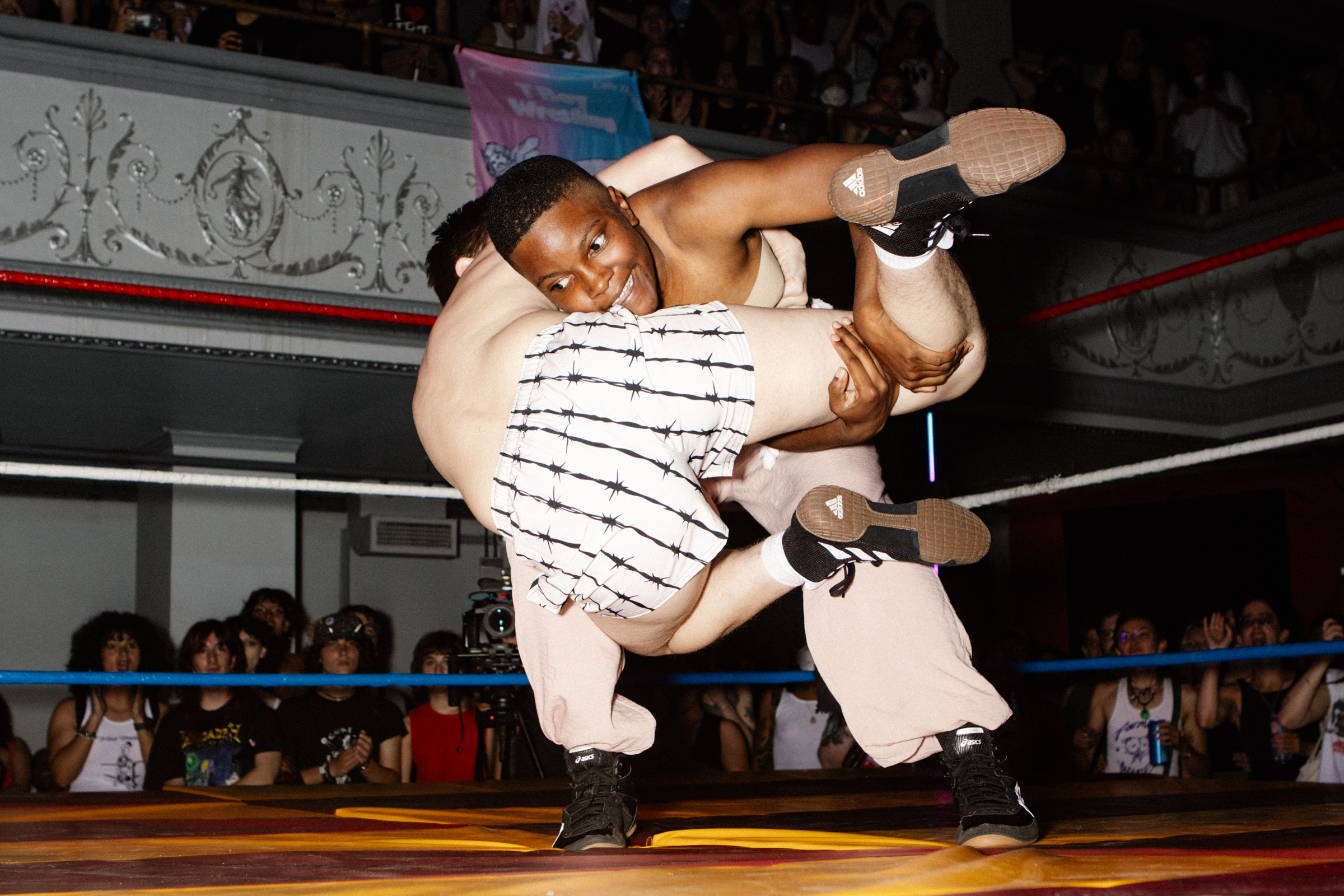
- Two transmasculine wrestlers at a T Boy Wrestling event in New York City (2025)
- Status: Dissolved
- Genre: Wrestling events
- Location: Based in Los Angeles
- Country: United States
- Years active: 2024–25
- Inaugurated: September 2024
- Founders: Adam Bandrowski and Mich Miller
- Website: www.transdudesofla.org/tboy-wrestling

T Boy Wrestling was a Los Angeles-based wrestling event created by queer social group Trans Dudes of LA (TDLA) which centered trans men and transmasculine people. It described itself as "a transmasc wrestling competition and performance art showcase." The first event took place in September 2024. High demand following this led to further events in Los Angeles as well as in Oakland, California and New York City. Significant debts accrued by the company led to the cancellation of all future events and the dissolution of TDLA from November 2025, and T Boy Wrestling had effectively ended by March 2026.

== Background ==
Trans Dudes of LA, a social group for transgender men, was started in 2023 by Adam Bandrowski in response to a lack of community and representation of transgender men. In August 2023, Bandrowski began to organize small meet-ups in Silver Lake and Echo Park, including hikes, beach days, and a pumpkin carving night. At a billiards night, Bandrowski met Mich Miller who had learned about the group via a flyer on a lamppost; Miller later became a co-director of TDLA. Both Bandrowski and Miller are artists. TDLA primarily focused on social activities, rather than other transgender spaces which often focus on sharing community resources. Their first ticketed event was Magic Dyke, a drag show with live music and performance art, intended to be a transmasculine pre-party before the lesbian-centric Dyke Day. At Magic Dyke, Bandrowski and adult-film actor "Noah Way" wrestled each other on stage which became a highlight of the evening—this performance is what set T Boy Wrestling into motion. While TDLA was Bandrowski's first big job, he had some event production skills from his attendance of California Institute of the Arts.

== History ==
The first T Boy Wrestling event took place in September 2024. T Boy Wrestling, according to then-co-director Miller, was a combination of professional wrestling and wrestling as a combat sport; he described the former as "performative" in a similar way to drag and both as "different brands of homoeroticism." Following this, the reelection of Donald Trump in the 2024 United States presidential election that November and his declaration that the US federal government would only recognize gender as the sex assigned at birth led to a want for a larger T Boy Wrestling event among both organizers and audiences. Miller said in April 2025 that "post-election, the emotional tenor and the need for this therapeutically from the crowd was higher than ever".

A second Los Angeles event, which was quickly sold out with 800 tickets, took place on March 22, 2025. At this event, there were around 80 performers and 40 wrestling matches. It was sponsored by TransGuy Supply, which sold sex toys and gender-affirming gear. Two of the wrestlers injected testosterone while in the ring at the event as a remix of Elton John's "Rocket Man" played, an act which was impactful among the crowd. Another event was held on March 29, 2025 at Silverlake Jewish Community Center, added due to high demand for the March 22 event. General ticket prices for this event were $40 per person, with a 50% discount for transgender people of color. By this point, the event's production value had increased since the first event to include an official boxing ring, bleachers, lighting equipment, and a jumbotron. Organizers planned to take T Boy Wrestling to San Francisco and New York City that year.

Another event at the Silverlake Center was held, selling over 500 seats and being watched by an additional 500 viewers through a Twitch livestream. This was followed by an event at the Hollywood Los Feliz Jewish Community Center which was their biggest event thus far, and was covered by the Los Angeles Times. The newspaper wrote that there was "gratuitous twerking; a prosthetic leg becoming an improvisational weapon; a whipped cream pie smashed against the face; a banana pulled out of boxers, peeled and eaten in front of an adulatory audience." It also listed that "people cosplayed Brokeback Mountain homo-eroticism; another pair act out a construction worker role-play in a BDSM scene in which a plastic hammer is shoved in the mouth." One wrestler took his testosterone shot on the wrestling mat during the event. Another event took place in Oakland, California on June 21, 2025. In July, a car wash fundraiser for future events was held in a parking lot in Glendale.

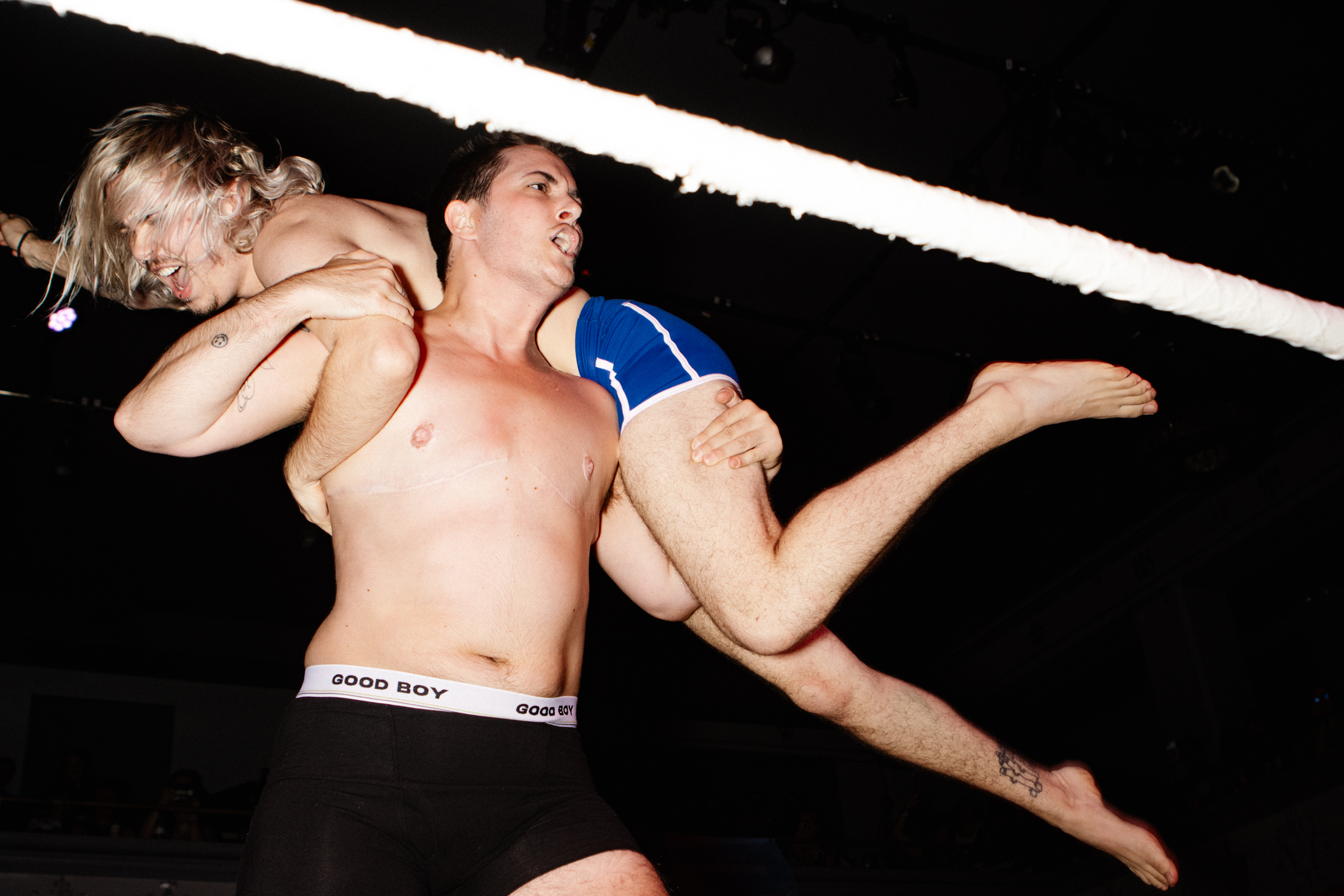
Many wrestlers applied for the first New York City event, causing a second day to be scheduled.

On August 9 and 10, 2025, the first T Boy Wrestling event in New York City was held over two days due to the high number of wrestlers who applied to participate. The event featured a “meet and greet” the Thursday prior as well as after parties each night, and tattoo artists tattooed people at the event. TransGuy Supply again sponsored, selling merchandise reading "I <3 TBOYS," as well as wrestling singlets, jockstraps, dildos, packers, STPs, and binders. The event was hosted by transgender comedian Marley Gotterer. Judges included Ceyenne Doroshow and Mack Beggs, who judged in the categories of Best in Show, Best in Hoe, Best Pair, and Mister Congeniality with a $500 cash prize for each.

On October 11 and 12, in the Avenue Portland event space in Northeast Portland, another T Boy Wrestling event took place that featured around 150 competitors. Weekly training took place ahead of the shows at Southwest Portland Martial Arts. Events were decided based on demand, which as of 2025 was nationwide. While Bandrowski and Miller in October stated that they wanted to host events in the Southern United States, they were limited to hosting events in liberal areas due to budgetary and safety restrictions. Trans Oregon pro-wrestler and special educational needs teacher Daniel Lopez competed in this event, during which his opponent allegedly botched a scoop slam, giving him a knee injury that left him unable to walk. Lopez later stated that he was left "screaming for help" and accused organisers of failing to take the injury seriously, as he said he had to call to the referee multiple times before an ambulance was called. He has said that T Boy Wrestling organisers failed to offer "any form of support" and that he was left with mounting medical debt.

=== Dissolution and potential successor ===
On November 7, 2025, co-founder Bandrowski announced on Instagram that Trans Dudes of LA would dissolve, stating that Miller had "mismanaged organizational funds and accrued debts" without his knowldege, that an LLC was never established for TDLA, and that Mich had used his own company to conduct TDLA business operations and finances. He stated that every T Boy Wrestling event "operated at a major loss." Debts, according to Bandrowski, were at an estimated total of $100,000. Ticket sales for all announced T Boy Wrestling events through Eventbrite in 2026 were put on hold, which had included events in Boston, Chicago, Los Angeles, New York City, San Francisco and Seattle. Bandrowski stated that TransGuy Supply, owned by founder Auston Bjorkman, had taken on leadership of T Boy Wrestling, and that he himself would continue working as part of this new structure. This deal later failed when multiple T Boy Wrestling operations team members left and Bjorkman backed out of the deal in response to negative reactions to its announcement on social media. OutSports reported in March 2026 that this had the effect of "effectively ending T Boy Wrestling."

In March 2026, transgender pro wrestler Kidd Bandit, who had previously appeared as both a wrestler and judge at some T Boy Wrestling events, announced that she would be launching a spiritual successor to T Boy Wrestling under a new company under her own management, and with an unnannounced name. She said, "It’s not the same company but the same idea. Cleaning up the carnie sh*t and ramping up production [...] The whole idea is to empower trans and [non-binary] people." She further remarked that "This isn’t my first rodeo dealing with a company that was focused on trans talent but the showrunner turned out to be a conniving manipulator. Trans rights, motherfuckers." Led by Kidd Bandit, T4T Wrestling launched its social media accounts on April 12, 2026 and announced its debut event for July 3 in Los Angeles.

== Wrestlers, matches and audiences ==
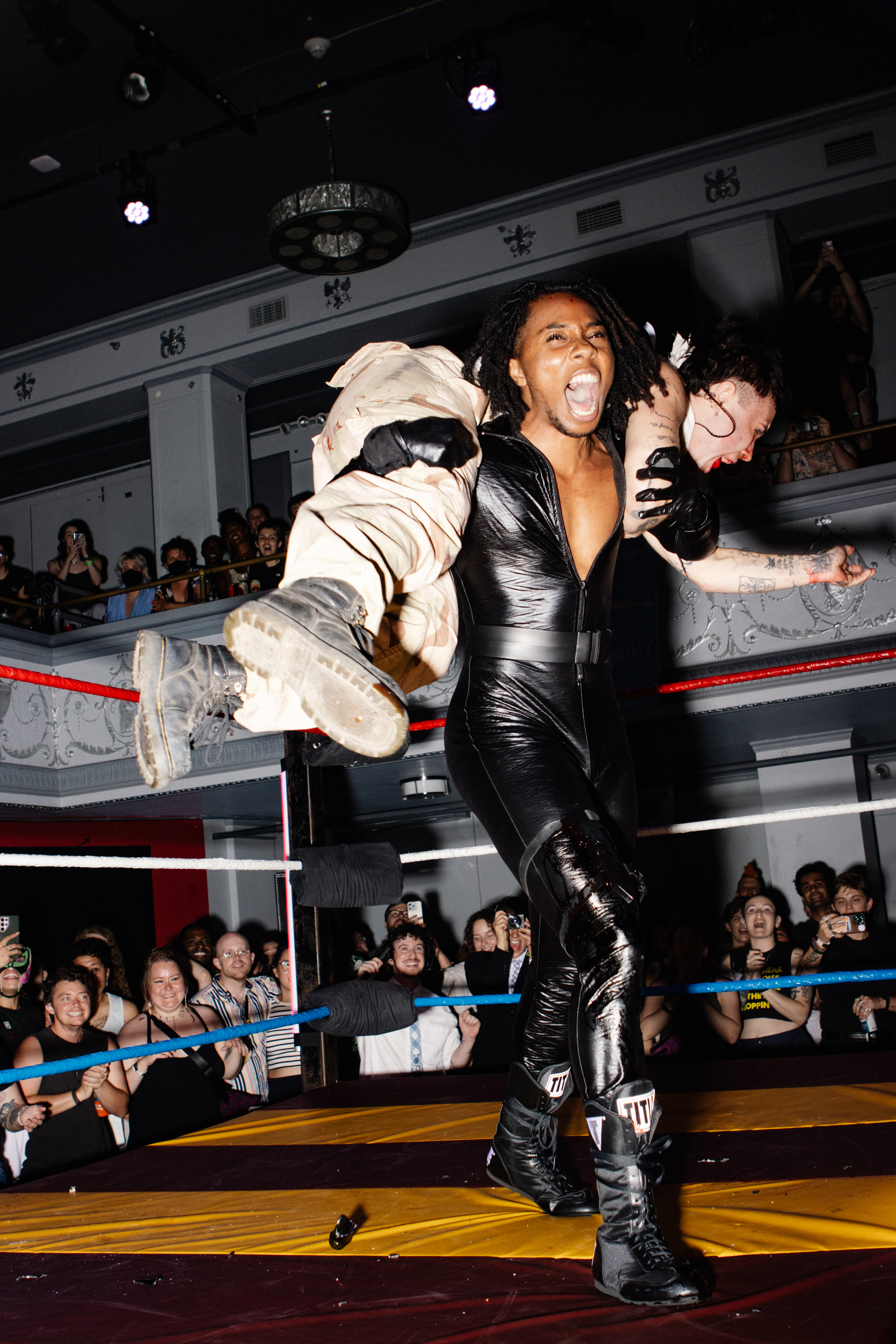
Matches at the events were often dramatic and camp.

While most wrestlers at the events identified as men, this varied, with competitors across a spectrum of genders. Wrestlers also varied in terms of whether they had had top surgery and whether they were using masculinizing hormone therapy or intended to do so in the future. At the March 22, 2025 event, the wrestlers included waiters, go-go dancers, accountants, DJs, artists and high school teachers. Each match at the event took place as a three-part act, with one-minute rounds. They featured extensive theatrics, camp, and homoeroticism.

An audience kiss cam was used, which drove some audience attendance. ASL interpreters were hired for the event to make it accessible for deaf audiences. Both generation Z and millennial audiences attended as of October 2024, possibly a result of the difference in age between then-co-founder Miller and Bandrowski. All attendees had to pass through a metal detector to enter the venues.

== Philosophy ==
A prominent goal of the events was to highlight a more expansive idea of trans masculinity, including those who were still working out their relationship to gender. The reclamation of ideas of masculinity was important in the event; Bandrowski said that wrestling "is traditionally a masculine sport. So I think a lot of TDLA is taking things that were traditionally meant for cis men and reclaiming them."
