= Doug Emhoff =

Second Gentleman of the United States from 2021 to 2025

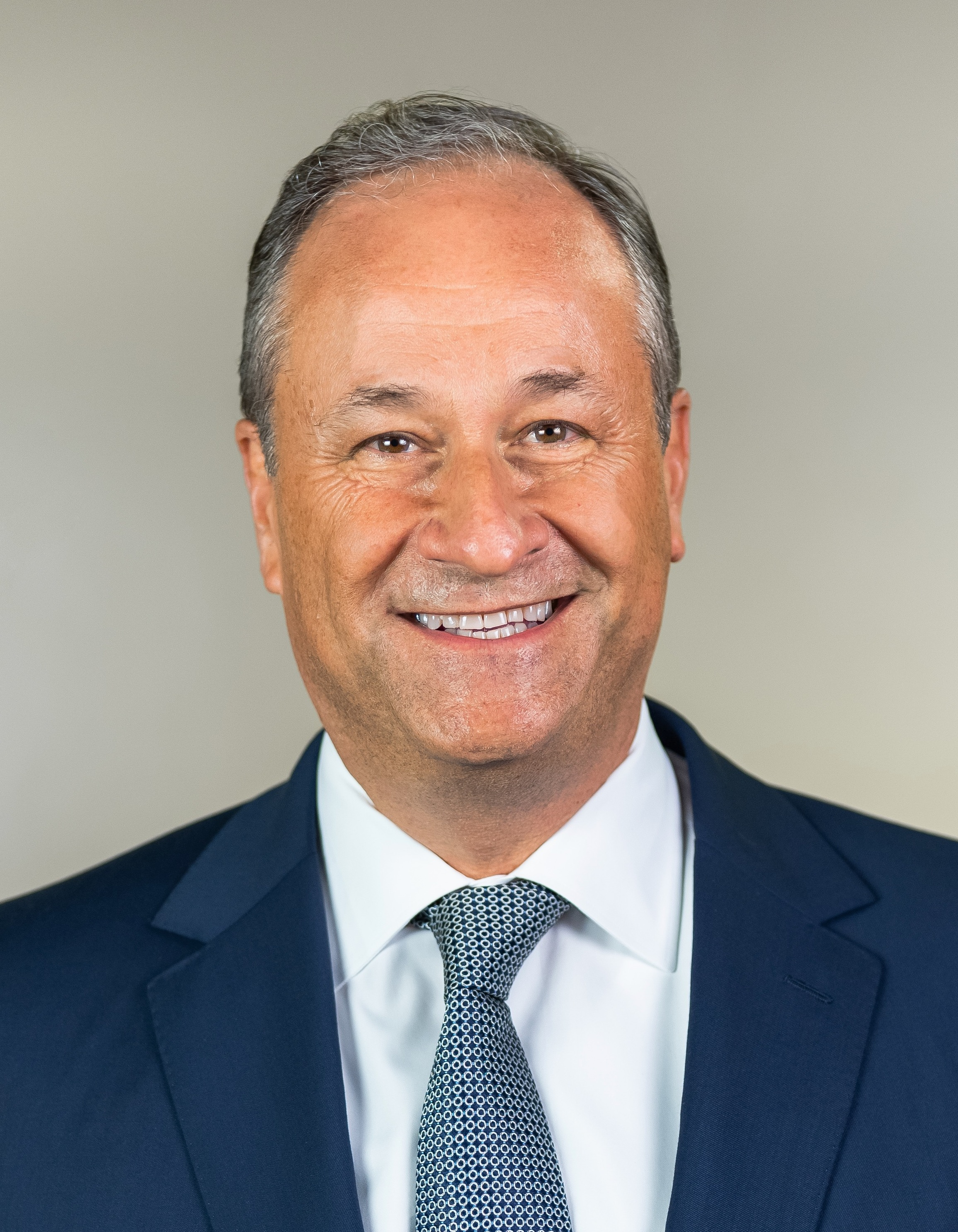
- Official portrait, 2022

Second Gentleman of the United States
- In role January 20, 2021 – January 20, 2025
- Vice President: Kamala Harris
- Preceded by: Karen Pence (Note: as second lady)
- Succeeded by: Usha Vance

Personal details
- Born: Douglas Craig Emhoff; October 13, 1964 (age 62) Brooklyn, New York, U.S.
- Party: Democratic
- Spouses: Kerstin Mackin (m. 1992; div. 2008); Kamala Harris (m. 2014)
- Children: 2, including Ella
- Relatives: Harris family (by marriage)
- Education: California State University, Northridge (BA); University of Southern California (JD)
- Doug Emhoff's voice Doug Emhoff celebrates the Passover Seder. Recorded April 12, 2023

Douglas Craig Emhoff (born October 13, 1964) is an American lawyer who was the second gentleman of the United States from 2021 to 2025. Married to the 49th vice president of the United States, Kamala Harris, who was the first woman in the role, and the Democratic Party's nominee for president in the 2024 U.S. presidential election, Emhoff was the first second gentleman of the country. He was also the first Jewish spouse of a U.S. vice president.

Emhoff began his career as an entertainment lawyer. He was managing director of Venable's West Coast offices and later became a partner at DLA Piper. He is also a distinguished visiting professor at USC Gould School of Law.

== Early life and education ==
Douglas Craig Emhoff was born on October 13, 1964, in the New York City borough of Brooklyn, the son of Jewish parents, Michael and Barbara Emhoff (née Kanzer). His ancestors moved to the United States from Gorlice, in Austrian Galicia, about 1899 due to persecution. Emhoff has a brother, Andy, and a sister, Jamie. From 1969 to 1981, he grew up in Matawan and Old Bridge Township, New Jersey, and attended Cedar Ridge High School. His family were congregants of Temple Shalom, a Reform synagogue in Aberdeen Township, and Emhoff had his bar mitzvah there in 1977. The next summer, in 1978, Emhoff attended Camp Cedar Lake in Milford, Pennsylvania, where he was voted "most athletic" of his division at age 13. When he was 17, he moved with his family to Southern California, where he graduated from Agoura High School in Agoura Hills. Emhoff earned a Bachelor of Arts degree in communication studies from California State University, Northridge, in 1987 and a Juris Doctor from the USC Gould School of Law in 1990.

== Career ==
Emhoff is a litigator focused on media, entertainment, and intellectual property. He was admitted to the California State Bar in 1990 and began his career at Pillsbury Winthrop's litigation group. He moved to Belin Rawlings & Badal, a boutique firm, in the late 1990s.

Emhoff opened his own firm with Ben Whitwell in 2000, which was acquired by Venable LLP in 2006. Emhoff became managing director of Venable's West Coast offices. Among his clients were Walmart, Merck, and Dolarian Capital. Emhoff was one of the lawyers representing Taco Bell's former advertising agency TBWA in a chihuahua-centric case.

Emhoff joined DLA Piper as a partner in 2017, working at its Washington, D.C., and California offices. He earned $1.2 million per year as a partner. Following the announcement that his wife would be Joe Biden's running mate in the 2020 United States presidential election, Emhoff took a leave of absence from the firm. After the Biden–Harris ticket won, the campaign announced Emhoff would permanently leave DLA Piper before Inauguration Day to avoid conflict of interest concerns.

In January 2025, after his wife left office, Emhoff joined Willkie Farr & Gallagher as a partner, splitting his time between Los Angeles and New York.

=== Academic career ===
In December 2020, Georgetown University Law Center announced that Emhoff would join the school's faculty as a distinguished visitor and fellow of the school's Institute for Technology Law and Policy.

In July 2025, Emhoff joined the faculty of the USC Gould School of Law as a distinguished visiting professor.

== Second Gentleman of the United States (2021–2025) ==
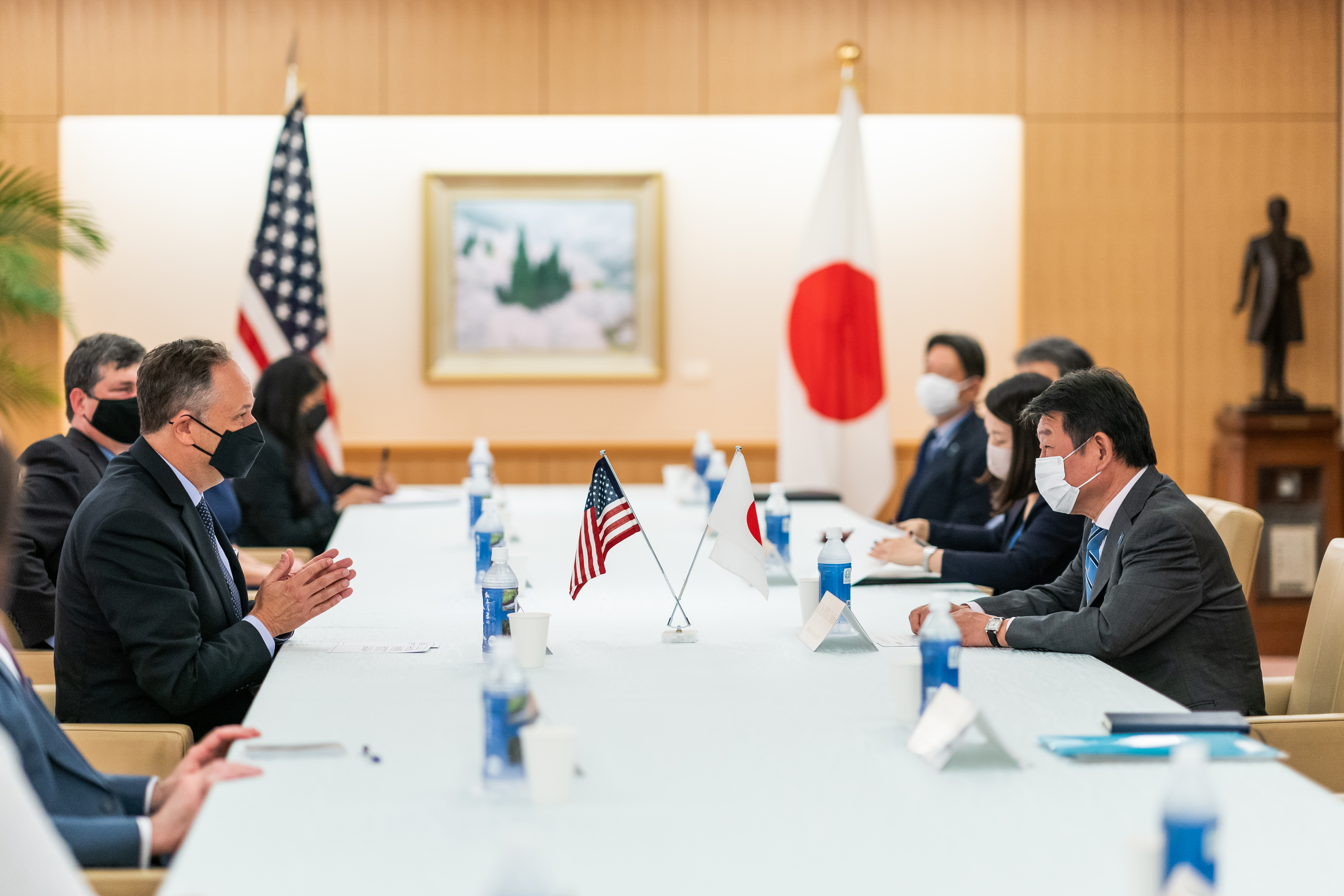
Emhoff meets with then-Japanese Foreign Minister Toshimitsu Motegi in Tokyo, August 2021

In August 2020, Harris was announced as Biden's running mate in the presidential election, making Emhoff the third man in U.S. history to be a spouse of the vice presidential candidate of a major party, after John Zaccaro (husband of Geraldine Ferraro) and Todd Palin (then-husband of Sarah Palin).

Emhoff said he filmed the viral "We did it, Joe!" video on November 7, 2020, which captured a phone conversation between Biden and Harris after they learned they had won the election.

When Harris assumed office, Emhoff became the first second gentleman of the United States. He is also the first Jewish spouse of a U.S. vice president. Emhoff was popularly labeled a "wife guy", a slang term referring to a man whose fame is owed to his wife (or content posted about his wife), or one who is exceptionally supportive of his wife. In 2020, Emhoff himself called himself a wife guy on Twitter.

In his role as second gentleman, Emhoff focused on equal access to justice and legal representation. He delivered remarks at the annual White House Legal Aid Interagency Roundtable, a roundtable discussion focused on how the federal government could simplify its processes for people seeking legal aid. Emhoff also undertook private visits to pro bono legal clinics and met with legal aid providers and their clients.

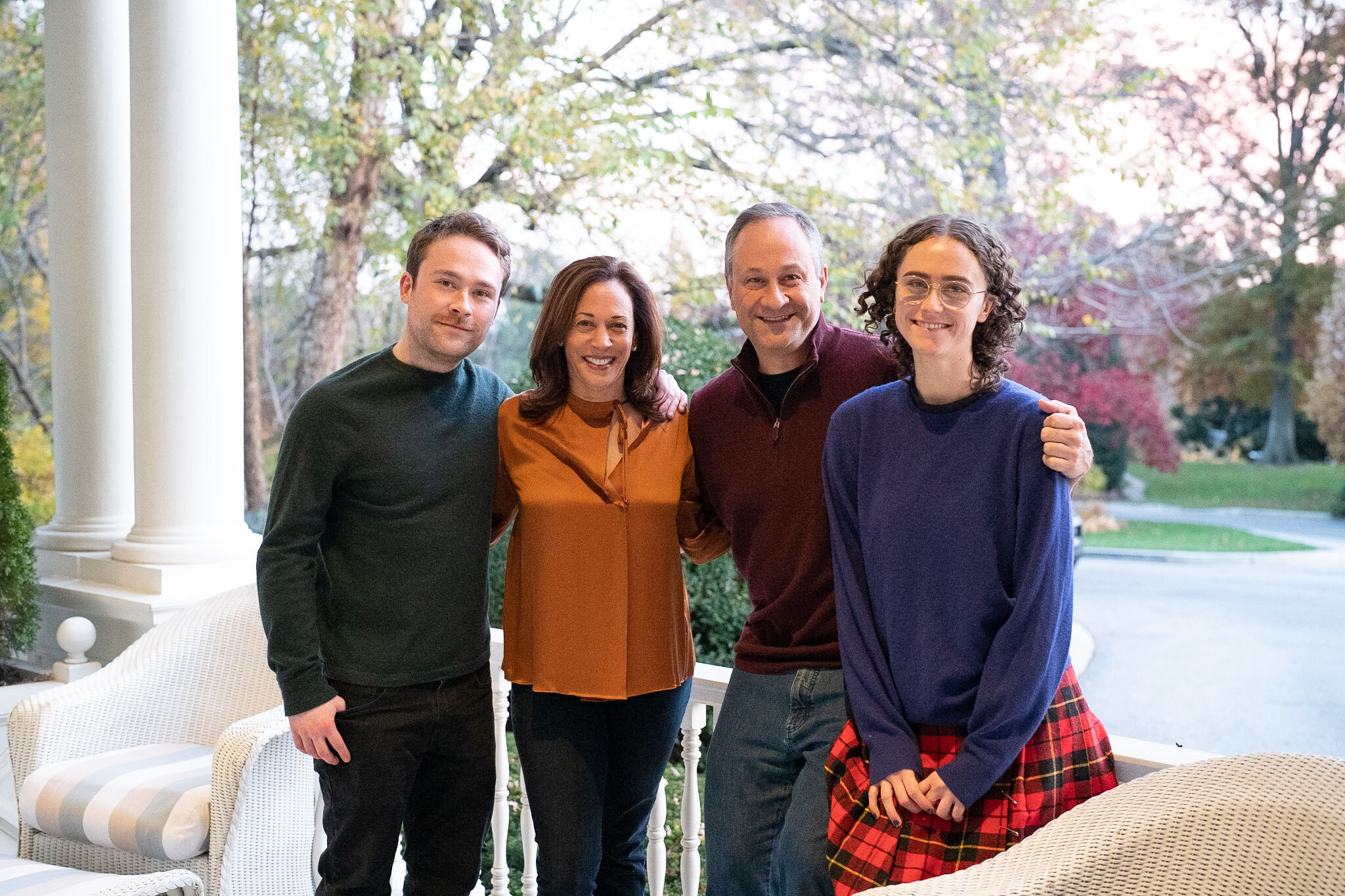
Emhoff with his family

In March 2021, while second gentleman, Emhoff began teaching a course called "Entertainment Law Disputes" at the Georgetown University Law Center. He said he respected educators as he had "learned [that] teaching is really hard", saying he has "so much respect for the teachers out there doing this each and every day."

Emhoff has led the U.S. delegations to several diplomatic events, including the opening ceremony of the 2020 Summer Paralympics in Tokyo and the inaugurations of South Korean president Yoon Suk Yeol and Philippine president Bongbong Marcos. In July 2022, he traveled to Eugene, Oregon, to participate in the opening ceremonies of the 2022 World Athletics Championships. Emhoff was part of the American legation to the 2024 Summer Olympics, attending several competitions and the closing ceremony.

In June 2023, Emhoff engaged with the Congressional Dads Caucus in a roundtable on Capitol Hill, discussing the Biden administration's family support programs. The discussion stressed the significance of universal family leave and encouraged its utilization. The roundtable's agenda focused on federal strategies to encourage co-parenting, promote paid family and medical leave policies, expand the Child Tax Credit, and improve access to affordable childcare.

As the husband of the presidential nominee, Emhoff delivers a speech at the 2024 Democratic National Convention.

=== Combating antisemitism ===
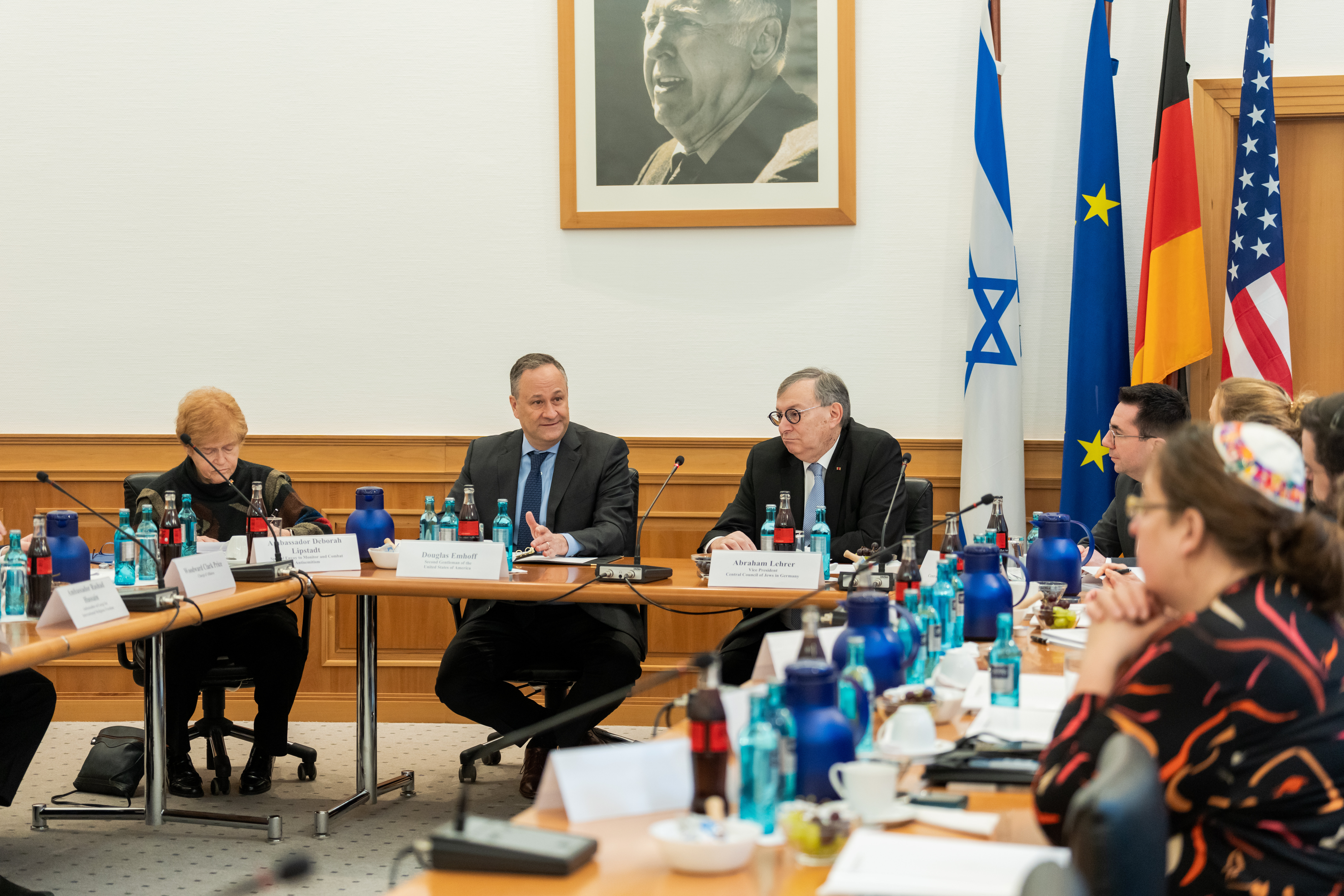
Emhoff (second from left) participates in an interfaith roundtable at the Central Council of Jews in Germany, Berlin, January 31, 2023

As the first Jewish spouse of a president or vice president, Emhoff emerged as one of the Biden administration's most prominent faces in the fight against antisemitism. After a November 2022 meeting between former president Donald Trump, Kanye West, and Nick Fuentes, the White House announced that Emhoff would lead a round table on antisemitism on December 7.

On International Holocaust Remembrance Day in January 2023, Emhoff visited the Auschwitz concentration camp in Poland alongside Holocaust survivors. His visit intended to pay tribute to the victims of the Holocaust and to honor survivors. During his time at Auschwitz, Emhoff laid a wreath at the camp's "Wall of Death," where thousands of prisoners were executed, and participated in a memorial service with the survivors in attendance. Harris was not present.

Emhoff was part of the White House team that launched the U.S. National Strategy to Counter Antisemitism, the country's first combatting antisemitism strategy, on May 25, 2023.

In the context of reactions to the Gaza war, Emhoff expressed concern about antisemitism in schools and on college campuses. He stated that conflations of Jewish identity with the actions of the Israeli government had led to increased hostility and threats against Jewish people. He said: "When Jews are targeted because of their beliefs or identity, and when Israel is singled out because of anti-Jewish hatred, that is antisemitism, and it must be condemned." Speaking about pro-Palestinian protests on university campuses, Emhoff supported the right to protest, but said that "calls for genocide" and the murder of Jews are "completely unacceptable and must be stopped."

== Personal life ==
Emhoff was married to film producer Kerstin Mackin from 1992 to 2008. They have two children together, Cole and Ella. Although Emhoff and Mackin's divorce was amicable, and they have since referred to each other as "friends", Emhoff has acknowledged that he had an extramarital affair with one of his children's teachers and that the affair contributed to the breakup of the marriage.

In 2013, Emhoff was set up on a blind date with Kamala Harris, who was attorney general of California at the time. They became engaged in March 2014, and were married at the Santa Barbara County Courthouse on August 22, 2014. Harris's younger sister, Maya, officiated at their wedding. As of November 2024, Emhoff and Harris had an estimated net worth of $8 million. The couple temporarily lived at Blair House in 2021, the official guest house of the president, while the official residence of the vice president, Number One Observatory Circle, underwent maintenance and renovation at the beginning of Harris's term. They also maintain homes in San Francisco; Washington, D.C.; and the Brentwood neighborhood of Los Angeles.

== Notes ==
Honorary titles
Preceded by Karen Pence as Second Lady	Second Gentleman of the United States; 2021–2025	Succeeded by Usha Vance as Second Lady
