= We did it, Joe! =

Viral video of Kamala Harris

"We did it, Joe!" is a viral video in which Kamala Harris, moments after learning she and Joe Biden had won the 2020 United States presidential election, calls Biden to congratulate him on their victory. The quote "We did it, Joe!" became a meme, and Harris's tweet publishing the video became one of the most-liked posts ever on Twitter (now X).

== Background ==
In the 2020 presidential election, Joe Biden and Kamala Harris were, respectively, the Democratic Party's candidates for President and Vice-President, running against then incumbent President Donald Trump and Vice President Mike Pence.

The 2020 presidential election was severely disrupted by the COVID-19 pandemic, which began notably affecting life in the United States in March 2020. Biden's general election campaign limited its in-person events, and the candidate appeared frequently via live and pre-recorded videos from the basement of his Delaware home.

The pandemic also caused an unprecedented spike in mail-in voting, which did not require voters to appear in person at polling stations. While media organizations have been largely able to predict the results of U.S. presidential races on election night in recent decades, several battleground states remained too close to call on November 3, 2020. In particular, a Pennsylvania law precluding the process for counting mail-in ballots until polls closed caused a marked delay in the state's tabulations. On the morning of November 7, the Associated Press and other major media organizations determined that Biden's lead in Pennsylvania was sufficient to declare him the winner of the state and thus president-elect.

== Video ==
At 12:23 p.m. Eastern Standard Time on November 7, after news organizations began calling the election, Harris tweeted a 16-second video in which she stands in a grassy field wearing athletic clothes and sunglasses, holding a cell phone in her right hand and wired ear buds in her left. A black Chevrolet Suburban crosses the frame in the first few seconds of the video, and a person in a black suit is seen in the upper right portion of the frame. Harris tells the person on the phone, reportedly Biden, "We did it. We did it, Joe! You're going to be the next president of the United States."

Harris's husband Doug Emhoff said that he filmed the video after the two received the news of the election result while they were out jogging. Twenty minutes before Harris posted the video, Emhoff tweeted a picture of the couple hugging in a grassy area. The event reportedly took place near the Biden campaign's headquarters in Wilmington, Delaware.

== Reception ==
Kamala Harris
(@KamalaHarris)
tweeted:

We did it, @JoeBiden.

7 November 2020

By the afternoon of November 7, the video had been liked on Twitter more than 800,000 times. In the days after the video was posted, creators on TikTok spoofed it using the original audio or their own renditions, exaggerating Harris's lilting tone and the lack of enunciation in her third sentence.

The phrase "We did it, Joe!" became adopted by White House personnel, including Harris and Emhoff, as a form of celebration. In February 2022, Kanye West released the song "Louie Bags", which samples the "We did it, Joe!" video in its introduction. In June 2023, the actress Keke Palmer delivered an impression of the "We did it, Joe!" phrase onstage with Harris at an event in New Orleans. Harris became known for releasing videos of consequential calls with political allies, posting a similar recording of a call with running mate Tim Walz in August 2024.

== See also ==
- What can be, unburdened by what has been
- You think you just fell out of a coconut tree?
