= Ceyenne Doroshow =

Ceyenne Doroshow (Park Slope, NY) is an author, activist, and the founder and executive director of G.L.I.T.S., an organization dedicated to creating sustainable housing and healthcare for Black transgender people. GQ described Doroshow as the "Godmother" of the Black Trans Lives Matter movement.

== Career ==
Doroshow's 2012 book Cooking in Heels: A Memoir Cookbook, offers a "memoir-in-recipes" recounting her life experiences prior to her grassroots activism.

In June 2020, Doroshow co-organized the historic Liberation March, a Black Trans Lives Matter silent march in Brooklyn, NY, along with activist Raquel Willis, artist and activist West Dakota, the family of Iyanna Dior, and several black and transgender community organizations including the Marsha P. Johnson Institute, The Okra Project, and Black Trans Femmes in the Arts.

Ceyenne was selected as a Grand Marshal for NYC Pride in 2021.

== G.L.I.T.S. ==
Doroshow founded G.L.I.T.S. (Gays and Lesbians living in a Transgender Society) in 2015 with the mission to provide long-term housing as healthcare for Black trans individuals in need. In an interview with activist Kimberly Drew via MoMA P.S. 1's Instagram page, Doroshow explained, "Creating housing is about saving people's lives. It's about getting them [Black transgender people] to the next step where they can be in their own kitchen ... and say, ‘I am home.'" According to their website, the foundation has facilitated services to educate mainstream healthcare and social service providers in both trans and sex worker rights as well as provide housing for post-incarcerated trans people and people who seek asylum for their sexuality or gender determination.

Doroshow and her G.L.I.T.S. team bailed LGBTQ inmates out of jails in 2020 to house them in safe Airbnb rentals during the COVID-19 pandemic. They also secured rent money and raised enough money to buy a $2 million 12-unit residential building that would be a free safe place for Black trans folks to live. The G.L.I.T.S. House in Queens, N.Y., opened in November.
