= The Reid Report =

- Also known as: AM Joy; The ReidOut
- Starring: Joy-Ann Reid
- Country of origin: United States
- Original language: English

Production
- Production location: New York City
- Running time: Programmed in hour-long block

Original release
- Network: MSNBC
- Release: February 24, 2014 – February 27, 2015
- Release: May 7, 2016 – July 19, 2020
- Release: July 20, 2020 – February 24, 2025

The Reid Report is an hour-long weekday U.S. and world political commentary program on MSNBC. Hosted by Joy Reid, it premiered on February 24, 2014, in the time slot formerly occupied by NewsNation with Tamron Hall. The show ended on February 27, 2015 due to low ratings, and Reid was shifted to another role as MSNBC national correspondent. Reid later hosted AM Joy, a weekend-morning talk show on MSNBC from May 2016 to July 2020, when she was moved to the 7pm weeknight slot to host The ReidOut, which replaced the slot occupied by Hardball with Chris Matthews, making her cable's first Black female primetime anchor. It was again ended in 2025.

Preceded by Ronan Farrow Daily	MSNBC Weekday Lineup; 2:00 pm – 3:00 pm (ET)	Succeeded by The Cycle
