= Kerstin Emhoff =

American film producer (born 1967)

- Born: Kerstin Jennifer Mackin; March 18, 1967 (age 59); Minneapolis, Minnesota, U.S.
- Education: Boston University (BFA)
- Occupation: Film producer
- Years active: 1998–present
- Spouse: Doug Emhoff (m. 1992; div. 2008)
- Children: 2, including Ella
- Awards: News & Documentary Emmy Award (2012)

Kerstin Jennifer Emhoff (née Mackin; born March 18, 1967) is an American film producer and the co-founder and CEO of the commercial production company Prettybird and creative studio Ventureland. She is a member of the Directors Guild of America, Producers Guild of America, and Television Academy.

Emhoff won a News & Documentary Emmy Award in 2012. As the CEO of Ventureland, Emhoff has executive produced documentaries including The Deepest Breath, Bobi Wine: The People's President, If These Walls Could Sing, and AKA Jane Roe.

== Life and career ==
Kerstin Jennifer Emhoff was born in Minnesota, the daughter of Kathleen "Katie" (née Davies) and James Mackin. She has two brothers, Seth Mackin and Kyle Mackin. Her parents divorced in 1982, and her father later remarried. After film school at Boston University, Emhoff moved to Los Angeles, where she got a job at a small production company and "was immediately hooked into the world of short form." By 2002, Emhoff was a principal (and executive producer) at HSI Productions. HSI creatives at that time included Paul Hunter, Hype Williams, and Diane Martel.

=== Prettybird ===
In 2007, Emhoff, together with Hunter, left HSI to co-found the production company Prettybird. Emhoff is Prettybird's CEO. Ad Age named Prettybird as Creativity's Production Company of the Year twice, in 2015 and 2021.

She was executive producer of Manhunt: The Search for Bin Laden (2013), which won the Primetime Emmy Award for Outstanding Documentary or Nonfiction Special, and produced Emmy Award-winning The Tillman Story.

=== Ventureland ===
In 2020, she joined with two of her Prettybird partners (Ali Brown and Paul Hunter) and long-time collaborator John Battsek to co-found Ventureland, a multi-platform entertainment company. Based in Los Angeles and London, Ventureland produces documentaries, scripted content, podcasts, and branded entertainment. As the CEO of Ventureland, Emhoff has executive produced documentaries including The Deepest Breath, Bobi Wine: The People's President, If These Walls Could Sing, and the 2020 documentary AKA Jane Roe.

Emhoff was on the board of directors of the Association of Independent Commercial Producers (AICP) for over ten years, and was the AICP President for Western United States. In 2015, she chaired the AICP annual show "The Art & Technique of the American Commercial." In 2020, she served as President of the Film Craft jury at the Cannes Lions International Festival of Creativity.

When Ava DuVernay partnered with Los Angeles mayor Eric Garcetti, Netflix, HBO and others to set up the Evolve Entertainment Fund (EEF), Emhoff was named to its first Advisory Board. According to Billboard, "The EEF is a public-private partnership between the City of Los Angeles, industry leaders in entertainment and digital media, non-profit organizations and educational institutions which is dedicated to building career pathways into film, television and music for women, people of color and low-income Angelenos through paid internships, focused mentoring and an ongoing series of workshops and panels."

== Personal life ==
She was raised in Minneapolis, Minnesota, and has mainly Swedish ancestry. In 1992, she married Douglas Emhoff, with whom she has two children, Cole and Ella. Their marriage ended in divorce sixteen years later. Kerstin, however, had chosen to retain her married name, legally and professionally. Kerstin Emhoff's ex-husband later married Kamala Harris.

Emhoff's two children have described the coparenting relationship between Emhoff and their stepmother, Kamala Harris, as "very healthy". She attended the 2021 presidential inauguration, where Harris was sworn in as vice president of the United States. In 2024, her defense of Harris as a "loving, nurturing, fiercely protective" co-parent was widely quoted.

== Selected filmography ==
- The Tillman Story (2010), executive producer
- Manhunt: The Search for Bin Laden (2013), executive producer
- Pretty Hurts (2013), Beyoncé music video, executive producer
- We Are the Giant (2014), executive producer
- Mojave (2015), associate producer
- XOXO (2016), executive producer
- The Monster (2016), co-producer
- We Are X (2016), executive producer
- The Final Year (2017), executive producer
- Legion of Brothers (2017), executive producer
- Ready for War (2019), producer
- AKA Jane Roe (2020), producer
- American Rapstar (2020), producer
- If These Walls Could Sing (2022), executive producer
- Theater of Thought (2022), executive producer
- FIFA Uncovered (2022), executive producer
- American Manhunt: The Boston Marathon Bombing (2023), executive producer
- The Deepest Breath (2023), executive producer
- Bobi Wine: The People's President (2023), executive producer

== Awards ==
- News & Documentary Emmy Award for Outstanding Informational Programming – Long Form (2012)
