= Ella Emhoff =

American fashion designer (born 1999)

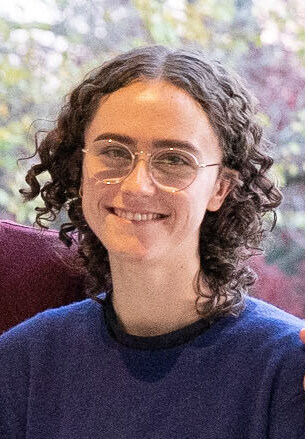
- Emhoff in 2024
- Born: Ella Rose Emhoff; May 29, 1999 (age 27)
- Education: The New School (BFA)
- Occupations: Fashion designer; artist; model; LGBTQ rights activist
- Known for: Member of the Second Family of the United States (2021–2025)
- Political party: Democratic
- Parents: Doug Emhoff (father); Kerstin Emhoff (mother)
- Relatives: Kamala Harris (stepmother)

Ella Rose Emhoff (born May 29, 1999) is an American model, artist, fashion designer, and LGBTQ rights activist. As the daughter of former U.S. Second Gentleman Doug Emhoff and stepdaughter of former Vice President Kamala Harris, she was a member of the Second Family of the United States from 2021 to 2025.

== Early life and education ==
Emhoff was born to Douglas Emhoff, an entertainment lawyer, and Kerstin Emhoff (née Mackin), a film producer. She was named after the jazz singer Ella Fitzgerald. Although her father is Jewish, Judaism is "not something she grew up with". Her parents divorced in 2008, when she was 9 years old.

In August 2014, when she was 15, her father married Kamala Harris, a lawyer then serving as Attorney General of California. Emhoff and her brother coined the term "Momala" for their stepmother. Emhoff, whose family members belong to the Democratic Party, was raised around politics. She and her family, as supporters of same-sex marriage in California, were active in fighting against the 2008 California Proposition 8. In 2016, when she was 17, her stepmother was elected to the United States Senate, representing California.

In 2017, Emhoff graduated from Wildwood School, where she was a member of the swimming and basketball teams. She was a student at the Parsons School of Design in New York City, where she majored in fine arts with a concentrated focus in apparel and textiles and graduated in 2021.

== Career ==
In 2014, Emhoff made a cameo appearance in the music video for Bo Burnham's song "Repeat Stuff".

Emhoff designs jackets, hats, coats, and knitted shorts, which she sells from her Instagram account and her website. She also sells ceramics, paintings, and drawings from her website.

In January 2021, Emhoff signed with IMG Models Worldwide, an international modeling agency based in New York City. She has gained attention from the BBC and the New York Times for having tattoos and not shaving her armpit hair. The agency announced her contract on Twitter. Earlier, she was featured in an editorial for the independent fashion magazine Buffalo Zine. Viola, her modeling agent, signed her to his agency in September 2019.

Emhoff is a member of The 3% Movement, an organization focused on increasing the number of women creative directors in the United States.

In 2021, she founded Soft Hands, a company focused on exploring "opportunities in fashion, design, creative consulting, and hosting events." Her mother taught her how to knit at age six. In 2023, she debuted "Ella Emhoff Likes to Knit," a pop-up presentation at New York Fashion Week. In 2024, she exhibited knit paintings at Gotham, a gallery in New York City. On August 29, 2024, Emhoff announced the temporary suspension of her Soft Hands Knitting Club due to security concerns related to her stepmother's presidential campaign. In a video posted to Instagram, Emhoff explained that she needed to pause the club's activities to protect herself and other members.

In 2025 she endorsed Zohran Mamdani in the 2025 New York City mayoral election.

== Public image ==
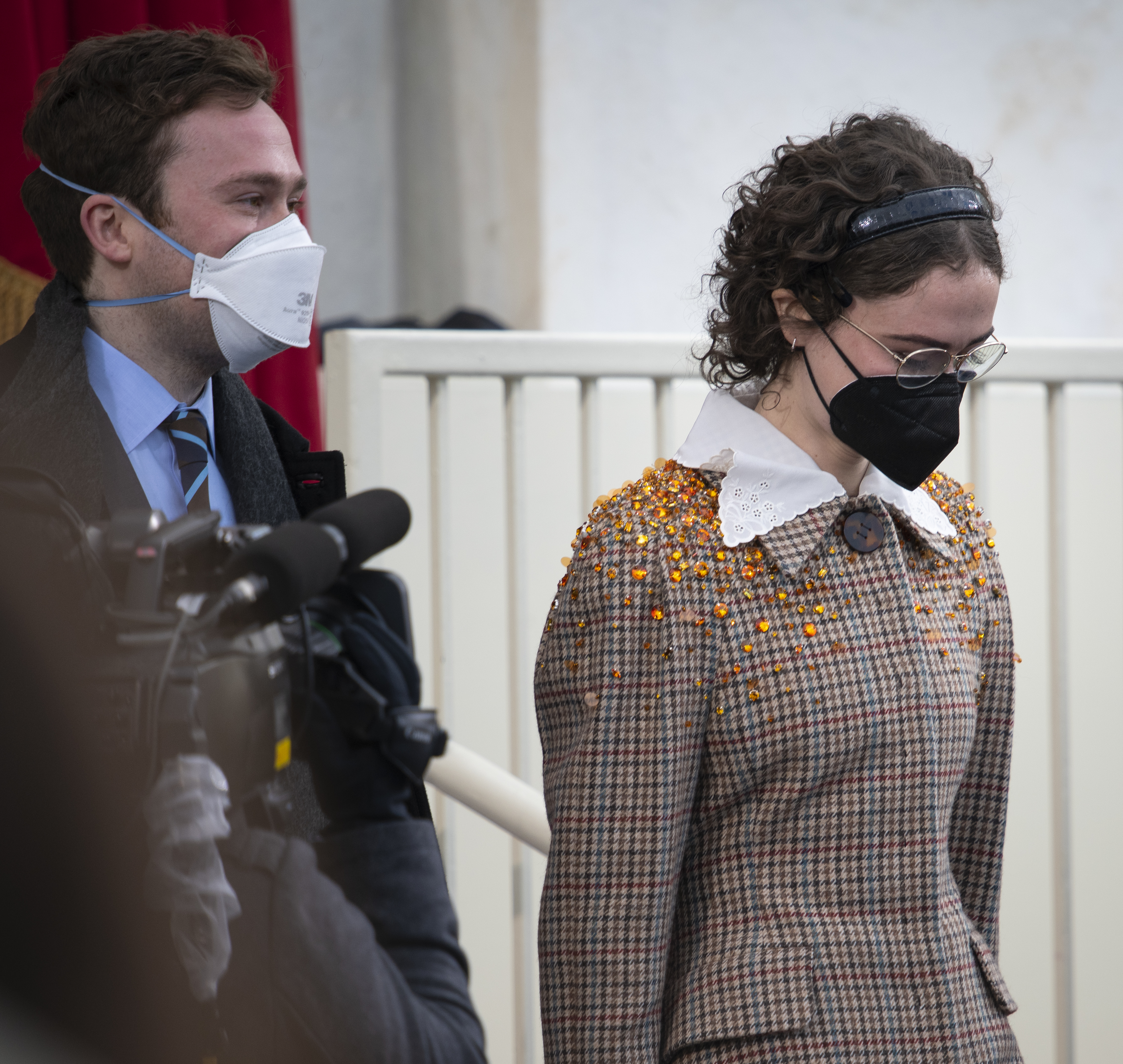
Emhoff (right) and her brother Cole (left) at the 59th Presidential Inauguration on January 20, 2021

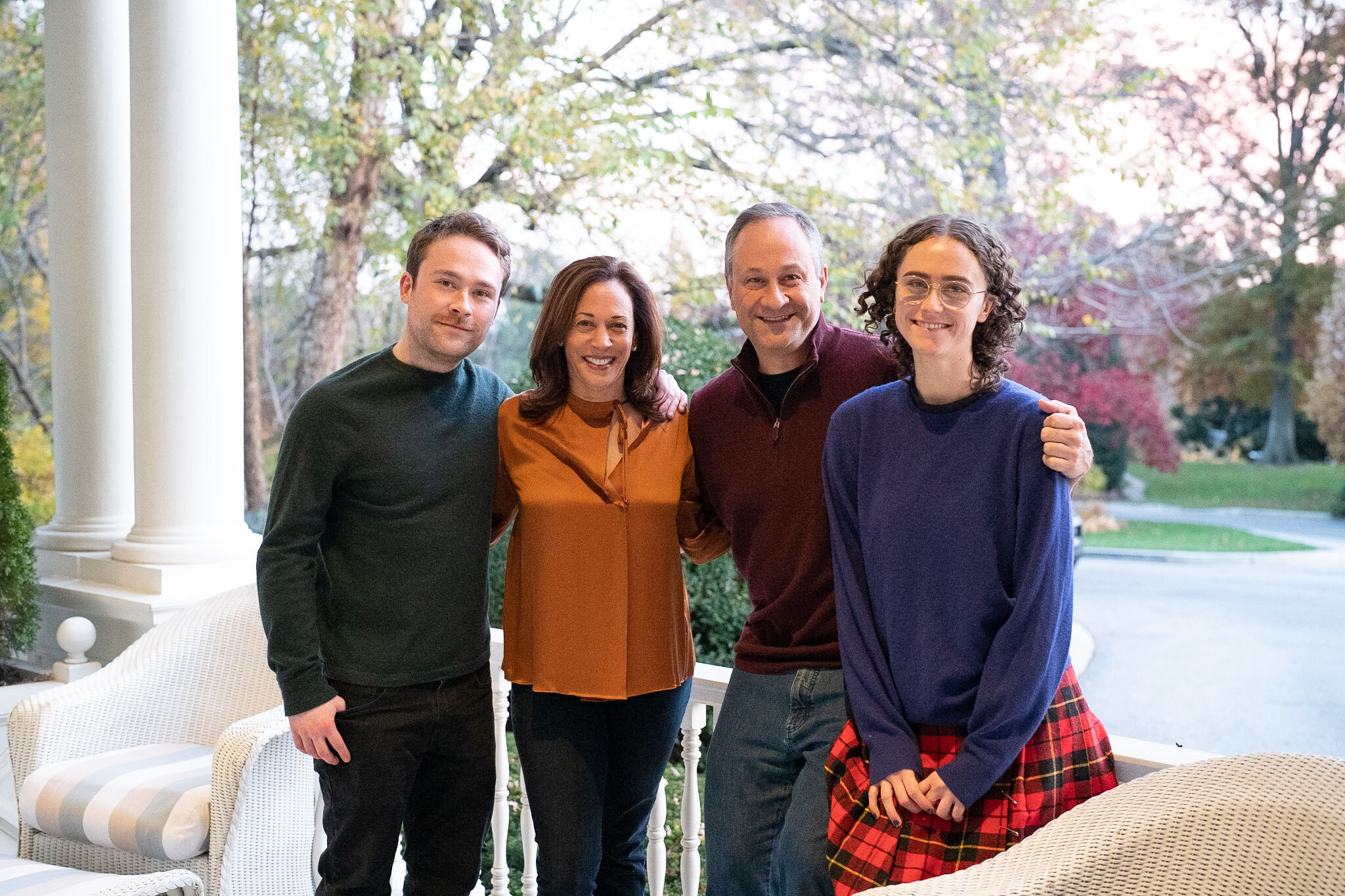
Emhoff with her father Doug Emhoff, stepmother Kamala Harris, and brother Cole, in June 2024

Emhoff lives in Bushwick, Brooklyn, and has been called "The First Daughter of Bushwick".

She is a supporter of LGBT rights, particularly as an advocate for the rights of transgender people. In 2020, she announced she would support the organization For the Gworls, a black, transgender-led collective that raises money to help black transgender people pay for rent, gender-affirming surgery, travel, and medical care.

Emhoff spoke in the broadcast of the 2020 Democratic National Convention in August 2020. On January 20, 2021, Emhoff attended the 59th U.S. Presidential Inauguration in Washington, D.C., where her stepmother was sworn in as the 49th Vice President of the United States

During the Gaza war, Emhoff encouraged her 318,000 Instagram followers to donate to the United Nations Relief and Works Agency (UNRWA) and the Palestinian Children's Relief Fund. However, after accusations surfaced that some UNRWA staff participated in the October 7 attacks, she removed the link.

Emhoff, along with Helena Hudlin and Meena Harris, Kamala Harris's goddaughter and niece respectively, spoke onstage during the 2024 Democratic National Convention. She received attention for her DNC outfit, designed by Joe Ando-Hirsh.

=== Fashion ===
Emhoff received international media attention at the inauguration due to her outfits, including a dress she co-designed with Batsheva Hay and a jewel-encrusted Miu Miu coat. Vogue wrote that Emhoff's inauguration outfit "perfectly married her signature Brooklyn quirk with the solemnity of the occasion" and that Emhoff "wouldn't be hewing to any outdated notions of what a White House-adjacent young woman should dress like." After the inauguration, Emhoff's Instagram following increased from 50,000 followers to over 300,000 in less than a week. Fashion retailer Lyst reported that, after footage of Emhoff went viral on Twitter and TikTok, Miu Miu saw a 455% increase in internet searches six hours after the inauguration. She also received attention for the skirt, tie, and Thom Browne coat she wore to the national COVID-19 memorial in Washington, D.C., the night before the inauguration.

Emhoff previously dated GQ fashion writer Sam Hine.
