= Joe Ando-Hirsh =

American fashion designer (born 1996)

- Born: January 10, 1996 (age 30); India
- Education: Fashion Institute of Technology
- Occupations: Fashion designer, actor, social media influencer

Joe Ando-Hirsh (born January 10, 1996) is an American fashion designer, actor, and social media influencer who first gained attention for custom, bespoke dresses he made for celebrities and posted about on his social media. He gained further attention after dressing Ella Emhoff for the 2024 Democratic National Convention. He launched his eponymous label Joe Ando in 2026.

== Biography ==
Hirsh was born on January 10, 1996 in India to parents described as "hippie". He is of Japanese and French heritage. They traveled until 2000, when they settled down in Long Island. In his youth, he knitted. He first studied finance in college, which he left after failing a statistics class, then studied acting in college before pivoting to fashion and transferring to the Fashion Institute of Technology, where he earned a one-year associate degree. He graduated during the 2020 COVID-19 epidemic. His first breakout post was his thesis collection, gaining over 600,000 views.

After graduation, he struggled to find a fashion job, so he moved into his parents' home. He made TikTok videos where he designed outfits for "anyone who would let" him in the garage. Soon, he began gaining popularity, however, and was asked to dress celebrities such as Millie Bobby Brown and Japanese Breakfast. He has also designed for Odessa A'zion, Laufey, Dakota Johnson, and Maitreyi Ramakrishnan, though he has stated many of the celebrities he has worked with have asked him to not post about it. His custom gowns have included a dress designed to appear as though it was blooming and a Milanese-styled gown placed in front of the Duomo. He made his first prom dress for a high school student with the help of the Children's Institute.

He gained further attention upon dressing Ella Emhoff, the stepdaughter of then-Vice President and presidential nominee Kamala Harris, for the 2024 Democratic National Convention. He has stated he considered the pressure she was under when designing her blue-and-white, off-the-shoulder dress, which he described as feeling "like a ballerina tea party". In the run-up to the DNC, he teased the dress and hinted at who it was designed for.

In 2025, he was the designer of a New York Fashion Week show for Raising Cane's Chicken Fingers inspired by breaded chicken.

On May 14, 2026, he debuted his self-titled brand, Joe Ando, a ready-to-wear brand available exclusively by pop-up and website. It was described as a "departure from his more colorful and sculptural bespoke designs" by the New York Times, who assessed it as minimalistic and emphasizing comfort. In August 2026, he collaborated with Lindt for confectionary-inspired dresses.

He is also an actor, and made his acting debut in MacGyver. He has also appeared in The Eyes of Tammy Faye and The Walking Dead season 9, where he played a teen named Rodney. He has also appeared in ads as Rodney. He has continued to act even after beginning creating TikTok fashion content. As of 2025, his most recent appearance was in 2024 movie Empire Waist, where he starred.

He has stated one of his goals as being to bring fashion "a sense of humor". As of 2025, he had more than 5 million followers on social media. He was named to the Time 100 Creators and the Forbes 30 Under 30 Social Media in 2025.

== Personal life ==
He was in a relationship with fellow influencer and model Niamh Adkins.
