= Batsheva Hay =

American fashion designer

- Born: 1980 or 1981 (age 45–46)
- Education: Stanford University; Georgetown University Law Center
- Occupation: Fashion designer
- Organization: Council of Fashion Designers of America
- Label: Batsheva
- Spouse: Alexei Hay (m. 2012)
- Website: batsheva.com

Batsheva Hay (born 1980 or 1981) is an American fashion designer and the founder of the label Batsheva, known for its modest prairie-style dresses. A former lawyer, she founded the label in 2016 after having a vintage Laura Ashley dress remade. She was a finalist for the CFDA/Vogue Fashion Fund in 2018, and in 2021 she co-designed Ella Emhoff's inauguration day dress.

== Early life and education ==
Hay grew up in the Kew Gardens neighborhood of Queens, New York, in a secular Jewish household. She graduated from Stuyvesant High School, then earned a B.A. from Stanford University, an M.A. in psychology, and a J.D. from Georgetown University Law Center. Before turning to fashion, she worked as a lawyer at a Manhattan law firm.

== Career ==
In 2016, Hay visited a dressmaker to have a favorite vintage Laura Ashley dress remade, and decided that she wanted to focus on fashion. She established her own label, Batsheva, that year. Her designs are modest yet whimsical, with stiff collars, tiered skirts, and "prints that are almost uncomfortably naïve". Hay's designs have been worn by Gillian Jacobs, Jessica Chastain, Lena Dunham, and Natalie Portman.

In 2017, one of Hay's dresses was included in Vogue in their roundup called "How to Wear Fall's Least Sexy Trends, from Clogs to Corduroys".

In 2018, Hay was one of ten finalists for the CFDA/Vogue Fashion Fund. She presented her Spring 2019 collection at New York Fashion Week that September. In 2021, she co-designed the inauguration day dress worn by Ella Emhoff, the stepdaughter of Vice President Kamala Harris.

Batsheva was again a CFDA/Vogue Fashion Fund recipient in 2021, when the fund awarded grants to all ten finalists during the COVID-19 pandemic. The label later expanded into new categories, including a collaboration with Anna Sui and a furniture line. In February 2024, her Fall 2024 show at New York Fashion Week featured a cast of women over the age of 40 and was opened by the actress Molly Ringwald. The following month, Hay opened the first Batsheva store, at 166 Elizabeth Street in Manhattan, with an interior she designed with Adam Charlap Hyman of Charlap Hyman & Herrero.

Hay has been a member of the Council of Fashion Designers of America (CFDA) since 2019.

== Personal life ==
She is married to fashion photographer Alexei Hay, and they live on the Upper West Side with their two children. They observe and practice Judaism.

A 2018 profile described Hay's Shabbat observance as including Friday-evening candle lighting and refraining from phone use on Saturdays.
