= Black Trans Femmes in the Arts =

American non-profit organization

Black Trans Femmes in the Arts is an American grassroots collective that provides support to Black trans women and Black trans nonbinary femmes in the arts. The organization, founded by Jordyn Jay, is based in New York, New York.

== History ==
Founded in 2019 while Jordyn Jay was studying for a Masters Degree in art politics at New York University, BTFA aims to connect and uplift Black trans women and Black trans nonbinary femmes who have a mutual interest in the field of art. After noticing a lack of knowledge of Black trans femme art in the art history courses at NYU, Jay began hosting open mic nights and building a social media presence to generate artist talks and performances that would provide Black trans femme artists with resources to be successful in the arts. The organization, which currently exists online, includes artist resources and directories, links to emergency relief funds, and more.

In June 2020, the organization, along with collectives and organizations like G.L.I.T.S., Black Trans Media, For the Gworls, The Okra Project, and the Marsha P. Johnson Institute, teamed together to organize the Brooklyn Liberation March. Later that year, the notorious fashion label Hood By Air announced a re-launch of their label. The announcement coincided with a benefit that collected over $200,000 for Black Trans Femmes in the Arts, the Emergency Release Fund, and Gays & Lesbians Living in a Transgender Society (G.L.I.T.S.).

In November 2020, fashion designer Ella Emhoff expressed her support for the organization and held a raffle to raise money for it.
