= Killing of Nina Pop =

2020 death of black transgender woman

- Part of violence against LGBT people in the United States
- Map of Sikeston
- Date: May 3, 2020
- Location: South New Madrid Street, Sikeston, Missouri
- Type: Murder by stabbing, hate crime
- Deaths: Nina Pop
- Convicted: Joseph Cannon
- Charges: Second-degree murder and armed criminal action
- Convictions: Voluntary manslaughter

In May 2020, Nina Pop, a young transgender woman of color, was stabbed to death in her Missouri apartment.

The Human Rights Campaign stated that Pop's death was at least the 10th violent death of an American transgender person or gender non-conforming person in 2020.

== Nina Pop ==
Pop was a black transgender woman. She lived 145 miles south of St. Louis in Sikeston, Missouri, a small town of 16,000 people.

== Killing ==
On May 3, 2020, a 28-year-old black transgender woman named Nina Pop was found dead with multiple stab wounds after being stabbed with a knife inside her own apartment on South New Madrid Street in Sikeston, Missouri.

== Aftermath ==
On May 15, 2020 in Dexter, Missouri, Joseph B. Cannon from Poplar Bluff, Missouri, was accused of Pop's murder and arrested for second-degree murder and armed criminal action. He pleaded not guilty, requested a public defender, and awaits trial. Eleven crime labs, anti-violence organizations, and police departments contributed to the investigation. Pop's death was being investigated as a potential hate crime.

In October 2025, Cannon was convicted of voluntary manslaughter and sentenced to 14 years in prison.

Sikeston Department of Public Safety and a local TV network initially misgendered Pop during their investigation and reporting, respectively.

== Community response ==
The Okra Project, a grassroots organization initially focused on addressing food insecurity in the black transgender community, dedicated $15,000 to form the Nina Pop Mental Health Recovery Fund and the Tony McDade Mental Health Recovery Fund in to raise money for free one-time mental health therapy sessions for black transgender individuals.

On June 2, 2020, thousands of people came together for a vigil and protest at the Stonewall Inn in New York City to honor the lives of Nina Pop and Tony McDade and protest police violence and transphobic violence against the black transgender community.
