= Joy Reid =

American political commentator (born 1968)

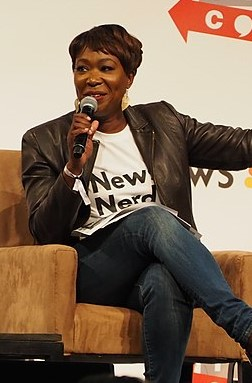
- Reid in 2018
- Born: Joy-Ann M. Lomena; December 8, 1968 (age 57); New York City, U.S.
- Education: Harvard University (BA)
- Occupations: television host; political commentator; author
- Notable credits: The ReidOut; The Reid Report; AM Joy
- Political party: Democratic
- Spouse: Jason Reid (m. 1997)
- Children: 3

Joy-Ann M. Lomena-Reid (née Lomena; born December 8, 1968) is an American political commentator and television host. She was a national correspondent for MSNBC and is best known for hosting the political commentary program The ReidOut from 2020 to 2025. Her previous anchoring credits include The Reid Report (2014–2015) and AM Joy (2016–2020).

The New York Times described Reid as a "heroine" emerging from the political movements and protests against Donald Trump. She has written three books: Fracture: Barack Obama, the Clintons, and the Racial Divide (2016), The Man Who Sold America: Trump and the Unraveling of the American Story (2019), and Medgar and Myrlie: Medgar Evers and the Love Story That Awakened America (2024).

== Early life ==
Reid was born Joy-Ann Lomena in Brooklyn, New York City. Her father was from the Democratic Republic of the Congo, and her mother a college professor and nutritionist from Guyana. Her parents met in graduate school at the University of Iowa in Iowa City. Reid was raised Methodist and has one sister and one brother. Her father was an engineer who was mostly absent from the family; her parents eventually divorced and her father returned to the Congo. She was raised mostly in Denver, Colorado, until the age of 17, when her mother died of breast cancer and she moved to Flatbush, in Brooklyn, to live with an aunt. Reid graduated from Harvard University in 1991 with a concentration in Visual and Environmental Studies.

In a 2013 interview, Reid recalled that her college experience was a quick immersion into a demographically opposite place from where she lived, from a community that was 80 percent African American to a community that was 6 percent African American. She had to learn to live with roommates and people who were not her family. She paid her own bills and tuition while at Harvard and said it was a good learning and growing experience overall.

== Career ==
Reid began her journalism career in 1997, leaving New York and her job at a business consulting firm to begin working in South Florida for a WSVN Channel 7 morning show. She left journalism in 2003 to work with the group America Coming Together to oppose the Iraq War and President George W. Bush. She later returned to broadcasting as a talk radio host and worked on Barack Obama's 2008 presidential campaign.

From 2006 to 2007, Reid was co-host of Wake Up South Florida, a morning radio talk show broadcast from Radio One's then Miami affiliate WTPS, alongside "James T" Thomas. She served as managing editor of The Grio (2011–2014), as a political columnist for The Miami Herald (2003–2015), and as editor of The Reid Report political blog (2000–2014).

Reid also teaches a Syracuse University class in Manhattan exploring race, gender, and the media. She and her husband, Jason, cofounded Image Lab Media Group, a production company, in 2005.

=== MSNBC tenure ===
From February 2014 to February 2015, Reid hosted her own MSNBC afternoon cable news show, The Reid Report. The show was canceled on February 19, 2015, and Reid was shifted to a new role as an MSNBC national correspondent. Beginning in May 2016, Reid hosted AM Joy, a political weekend-morning talk show on MSNBC, and was a frequent substitute for other MSNBC hosts, including Chris Hayes and Rachel Maddow. As of 2018, Reid's morning show on Saturdays averaged nearly one million weekly viewers.

In 2017, Reid ranked fourth among Twitter's top tweeted news outlets and most tweeted journalist at each outlet. The Daily Dot credited her in August of that year with coining the term KHive for supporters of Kamala Harris.

In July 2020, MSNBC announced that Reid would host The ReidOut, a new Washington-based weeknight commentary show in the 7 p.m. Eastern time slot vacated by the March 2020 retirement of Hardball host Chris Matthews, making her cable's first Black female primetime anchor. On February 23, 2025, The New York Times reported that MSNBC had canceled The ReidOut, with plans to air its final episode during the week of February 24–28. The final broadcast of The ReidOut would air on February 24, 2025.

=== Post-MSNBC ===
The day prior to the New York Times report of her ouster, Reid launched The Joy Reid Show as a channel on YouTube through Image Lab.

== Reception and honors ==
In 2015, Reid gave the inaugural Ida B. Wells lecture at Wake Forest University's Anna Julia Cooper Center. In 2016, The Hollywood Reporter said she had the "ability to break down complex issues in a way that makes them digestible and accessible." In 2018, The New York Times stated that "Ms. Reid, the daughter of immigrants, has emerged as a 'heroine' of the anti-Trump 'resistance'."

Reid was a 2003 Knight Center for Specialized Journalism fellow. In 2018, Reid was nominated for three NABJ Salute to Excellence Awards. One for her segment in which a pastor is pulled to safety at the Charlottesville white nationalist march, one for her reporting on damage caused by the hurricanes on the US Virgin Islands, and one for the segment that won her an award for "Time: The Kalief Browder Story," in which Reid sat down with Kalief's brother Deion Browder and filmmaker Julia Mason. In 2016, Reid received the Women's Media Center's Carol Jenkins Visible and Powerful Media Award.

Reid received a 2025 Gary Webb Anti-Censorship Award from PEN Oakland.

== Controversies ==
=== Deleted blog controversies ===
In late 2017, and again in April 2018, Twitter user @Jamie_maz reproduced posts written between 2007 and 2009 on Reid's former blog Reid Report which, as The Nation described it, "us[ed] the trope of gay sex to mock politicians and journalists." Following criticism, Reid apologized, calling the posts "insensitive, tone-deaf and dumb." A second batch of posts gained attention, which described kissing between men as disgusting to straight people, accused gay men of being "attracted to very young, post-pubescent types", and declared opposition to same-sex marriage. In one post, Reid wrote about her views: "Does that make me homophobic? Probably." Reid claimed she did not remember making those posts, and asked lawyers to investigate if her blog or its archives might have been hacked, though the Wayback Machine, where the posts had been found, said it detected no evidence of hacking in the archived versions of her site. The second batch of posts prompted LGBT advocacy group PFLAG to rescind its plan to give Reid an award, and The Daily Beast to suspend future columns from her. An analysis published by The Daily Beast thoroughly disputed her claims of being a victim of hacking. Reid opened the April 28, 2018, edition of AM Joy with an apology. Responses to her apology tended to be divided along party lines.

In April 2018, further blog posts from 2005 through 2007 were brought to public attention. According to The Washington Post, Reid's controversial remarks included encouraging her readers to watch the "truther" conspiracy-theory film Loose Change and saying of Israel "God is not a real estate broker. He can't just give you land 1,000 years ago that you can come back and claim today." Reid claimed Jewish people spend half a million dollars on their bar and bat mitzvah celebrations. She also described CNN's Wolf Blitzer, who is Jewish and worked as an editor for AIPAC early in his career, as a "former flak for the American Israeli Public Affairs Committee [sic]" who "doesn't even try to hide his affinity for his Israeli guests, or his partisanship for their cause", and accused him of bias against Arab and Muslim guests on his show. The Zionist Organization of America called for MSNBC to fire Reid for promoting "sinister anti-Semitic canards". Another controversial post, from 2007, contained a photoshopped image of Senator John McCain's face superimposed on the body of Seung-Hui Cho, who perpetrated the Virginia Tech shooting.

In June 2018, Reid formally apologized for her past writings, saying, "I'm a better person today than I was over a decade ago. There are things I deeply regret and am embarrassed by, things I would have said differently, and issues where my position has changed. Today I'm sincerely apologizing again." MSNBC expressed its continued support, saying in a statement that some of the blog posts were "obviously hateful and hurtful," but that they were "not reflective of the colleague and friend we have known at MSNBC for the past seven years" and that "Joy has apologized publicly and privately and said she has grown and evolved in the many years since, and we know this to be true."

=== Other controversies ===
On the September 1, 2020 episode of The ReidOut, Reid criticized President Donald Trump's unwillingness to condemn Kyle Rittenhouse. She held that this amounted to what US media would usually describe as "radicalizing people" in the case of "leaders, let's say in the Muslim world, talk a lot of violent talk and encourage their supporters to be willing to commit violence including on their own bodies in order to win against whoever they decide is the enemy". The Southern Poverty Law Center and Muslim Advocates, both civil rights organizations, and representatives Ilhan Omar and Rashida Tlaib criticized Reid's remarks as Islamophobic and called for an apology. Conversely, commentator Jennifer Rubin defended Reid, arguing she had merely highlighted a double standard in the media without endorsing it.

== Personal life ==
In 1997, Reid married Jason Reid, who later became a documentary film editor. The couple has three children.

== Works ==
- Reid, Joy-Ann (February 6, 2024). Medgar and Myrlie: Medgar Evers and the Love Story That Awakened America. Mariner Books. ISBN 978-0-06-306879-7.
- Reid, Joy-Ann (June 25, 2019). The Man Who Sold America: Trump and the Unraveling of the American Story. Mariner Books. ISBN 978-0062880109.

== See also ==
- New Yorkers in journalism
