= Kamala Harris 2020 presidential campaign =

American political campaign

Kamala Harris for President 2020
- Campaign: 2020 United States presidential election (Democratic Party primaries)
- Candidate: Kamala Harris U.S. Senator from California (2017–2021); Attorney General of California (2011–2017); District Attorney of the City and County of San Francisco (2004–2011)
- Affiliation: Democratic Party
- Status: Suspended; became running mate on August 11, 2020
- Announced: January 21, 2019
- Launched: January 27, 2019
- Suspended: December 3, 2019
- Headquarters: Baltimore, Maryland (national); Oakland, California (West Coast)
- Key people: Maya Harris (campaign chair); Juan Rodriguez (campaign manager)
- Receipts: US$40,884,095.73 (2019-12-31)
- Slogan: For the People

Website
- kamalaharris.org (archived - December 2, 2019)

The 2020 presidential campaign of Kamala Harris, a United States senator from California from January 2017 to 2021, officially began on January 21, 2019, with an announcement on Good Morning America. Harris had widely been considered a "high profile" candidate for the 2020 Democratic Party presidential primaries since 2016. Citing a lack of funds, Harris officially withdrew her candidacy on December 3, 2019.

On March 8, 2020, Harris endorsed former vice president Joe Biden. Eight months after the conclusion of her campaign, Harris was chosen by Democratic nominee Biden to be his running mate on August 11, 2020. Biden and Harris would went on to win the general election, and were sworn in on January 20, 2021, causing Harris to leave the Senate after 4 years, becoming the first female vice president of the United States. Biden initially ran for re-election in 2024 with Harris would remain his running mate but ultimately withdraw from the race and immediately endorsed Harris, who launched her second campaign for president later that day. Harris would go on to become the Democratic nominee, but lost the general election to Biden's predecessor, former president and Republican nominee Donald Trump, who became the 47th president of the United States. Biden and Harris served only one term in office.

== Background ==
Following the election of Donald Trump in November 2016, Harris was named as part of the "Hell-No Caucus" by Politico in 2018, along with Senators Cory Booker, Kirsten Gillibrand, Elizabeth Warren, and Bernie Sanders, given she voted "overwhelmingly to thwart [Trump's] nominees for administration jobs", such as with Rex Tillerson, Betsy DeVos, and Mike Pompeo; all the senators in this group were considered potential 2020 presidential contenders at this point in time. Prior to announcing her candidacy, she had publicly stated that she was "not ruling it out". In December 2018, Harris announced that she planned on considering whether to run for president "over the holiday". The following month, it was confirmed that Harris was expected to make an official announcement around Martin Luther King Jr. Day regarding the 2020 election.

Harris was the sixth office-holding Democrat to formally announce a campaign in the 2020 U.S. presidential election, joining Massachusetts senator Elizabeth Warren, Hawaii congresswoman Tulsi Gabbard, former Maryland congressman John Delaney, former West Virginia state senator Richard Ojeda, former U.S. secretary of housing and urban development Julian Castro, and New York senator Kirsten Gillibrand.

Prior to and during her presidential campaign, an online informal grouping using the hashtag #KHive formed to support her candidacy and defend her from racist and sexist attacks. Joy Reid first used the term in August 2017 in a tweet saying "@DrJasonJohnson @ZerlinaMaxwell and I had a meeting and decided it's called the K-Hive."

== Campaign ==
=== Announcement ===
On Martin Luther King Jr. Day, January 21, 2019, Harris announced on Good Morning America that she would be seeking the Democratic presidential nomination. Her campaign headquarters were in Baltimore, Maryland, with a second office in Oakland, California. Her campaign slogan, "For the People", is the phrase she used to formally announce her appearances as a prosecutor in the California superior courts as implicitly required by California law.

Within twenty-four hours of the announcement, Harris's campaign received over $1.5 million in donations from about 38,000 individuals across all fifty states, with the average donation being $37. At the time, this record amount tied with the one set by U.S. senator Bernie Sanders during the 2016 election.

An overflow crowd of over 20,000 attended her formal campaign kickoff event at Frank Ogawa Plaza in her hometown of Oakland, California, on January 27. Numerous commentators noted that there were more attendees at Harris's kickoff event than Barack Obama's first presidential campaign kickoff in Springfield, Illinois, in 2007.

=== First quarter ===
On January 28, Harris introduced herself as a 2020 presidential candidate in a CNN town hall at Drake University in Des Moines, Iowa.

In the first quarter of her campaign, Harris announced the endorsements of five members of the California delegation in the U.S. House of Representatives – Ted Lieu, Katie Hill, and Nanette Barragan on January 28, Barbara Lee on February 14, and Julia Brownley on February 27. Continuing her early show of force from her home state, Harris also secured the endorsement of the Governor of California, Gavin Newsom, along with five statewide officials from California – Lieutenant Governor Eleni Kounalakis, Secretary of State Alex Padilla, State Treasurer Fiona Ma, Superintendent of Public Instruction Tony Thurmond, and Insurance Commissioner Ricardo Lara She also secured the endorsements from three-quarters of the Democratic delegation in the California State Senate, along with endorsements from the mayors of California cities San Francisco, San Jose, Sacramento, Long Beach, Oakland, and Compton. Harris also secured the support of former Massachusetts Attorney General Martha Coakley and Latina labor rights activist and co-founder of the United Farm Workers union, Dolores Huerta.

Harris came under criticism when, in February 2019, she immediately believed the Jussie Smollett hate crime hoax while the affair had already been strongly questioned by the Chicago Police Department. She called it a "modern-day lynching" and used it to push for the adoption of a law co-sponsored by her. The incident later turned out to be staged, and Harris had to walk back her comments. The Daily Beast asserted this was representative of her supposed "habit of making flip comments, and tending to latch on to narratives that confirm her preferred political worldview".

In March, Harris headlined a fundraiser from high-profile Hollywood donors at the home of American filmmaker J. J. Abrams and Katie McGrath. Co-chairs for the event included various other high-level studio executives, actors, writers, and directors, including Ari Emanuel, Donna Langley, Shonda Rhimes, and Ron Meyer. Harris reported raising $12 million from more than 218,000 individual contributions in the first quarter.

=== Second quarter ===
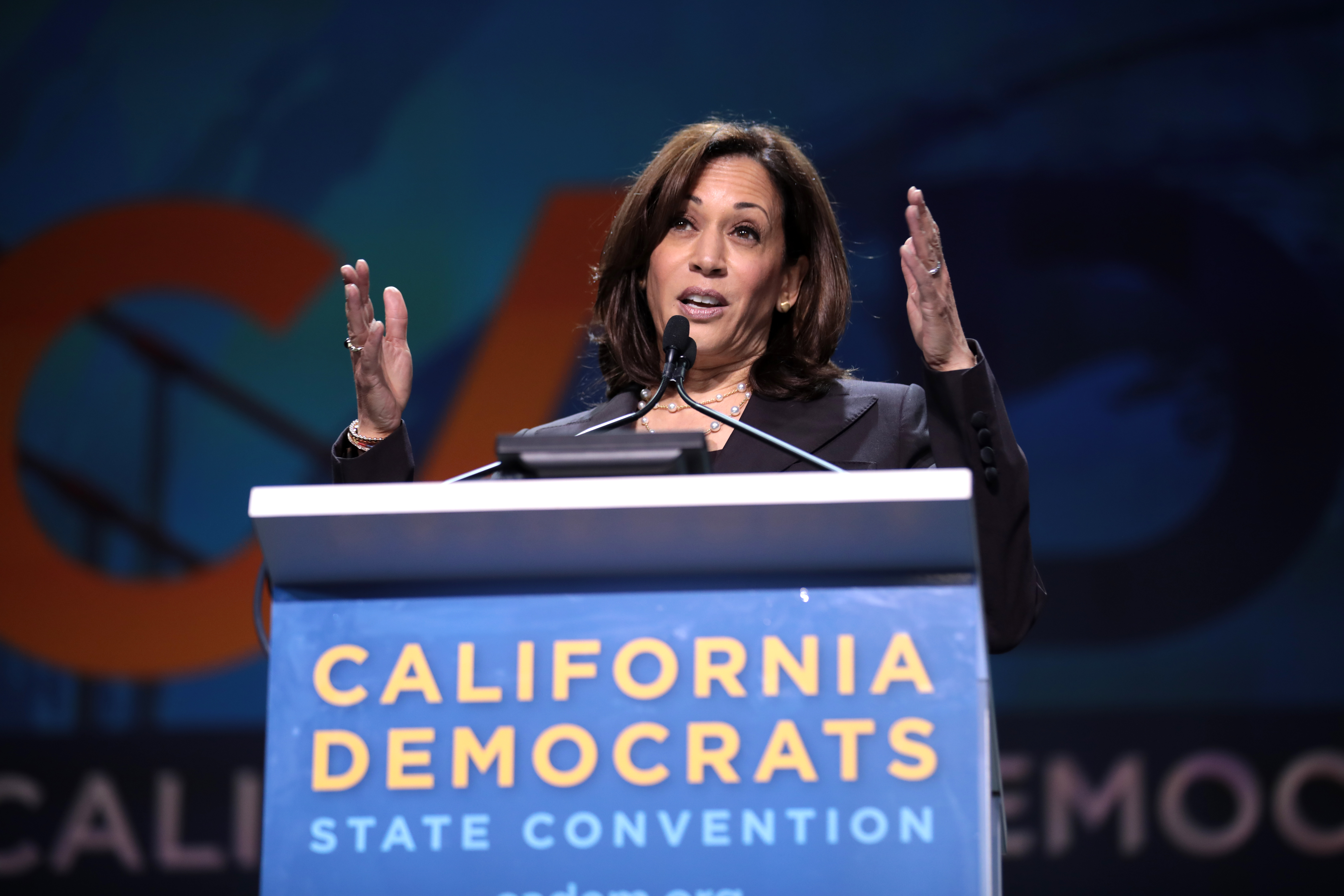
Harris at the California Democrats State Convention in 2019

On April 1, Harris delivered a speech at a labor dinner honoring state legislators in Sacramento, California, where she listed workers benefits that would not have been made possible without organized labor and condemned rhetoric that described unions as "special-interest groups".

On April 14, Harris released all her personal tax returns from 2004 to 2018, each year that Harris has held public office. A Harris campaign aide said Harris's disclosure made her "the most transparent candidate in the field when it comes to information about personal finances".

On May 5, Harris gave a speech at the Fight for Freedom Fund Dinner of the Detroit Branch NAACP in which she pledged that her administration would "hold social media platforms accountable for the hate infiltrating their platforms, because they have a responsibility to help fight against this threat to our democracy" and referred to 2018 as the "deadliest year on record for domestic terrorism" since the 1995 Oklahoma City bombing.

On May 16, Harris announced that her campaign had raised over $160,000 for abortion rights groups, following Alabama lawmakers approving a measure that outlawed almost all abortions including instances of rape or incest and imposed criminal penalties on doctors that had performed the procedure.

On June 1, Harris delivered remarks at a San Francisco forum sponsored by the liberal group MoveOn when an animal rights protester jumped on stage and grabbed the microphone out of Harris's hand while she was trying to talk about equal rights. Moderator Karine Jean-Pierre moved to stand between Harris and the protester until security guards escorted him offstage.

On June 26 and 27, the first debate of the primary season was held at the Arsht Center in Miami, Florida, hosted by NBC and MSNBC. It was split into two parts, with 10 candidates debating on June 26 and 10 other candidates debating on June 27; a random drawing placed Harris in the latter group of candidates. On June 27, at one point in the debate, Harris criticized her fellow candidates for talking over each other, saying "America does not want to witness a food fight. They want to know how we are going to put food on their table." Later, she criticized Joe Biden for his comments regarding his past work with segregationist Senators and his past opposition to busing. Her widely quoted comment was:

There was a little girl in California who was part of the second class to integrate her public schools and she was bused to school every day. That little girl was me!

Harris's performance in the debate received praise from many in the media, with some journalists referring to her as the unofficial winner. Morning Consult and FiveThirtyEight worked together on polling that reported that Harris's support among Democrats went from about 8% before the debate to almost 17% after the debate. Harris raised $2 million in donations in the first 24 hours after the debate, which is the highest amount of money that her campaign had raised in a 24-hour period to that date. President Donald Trump criticized Harris, saying she was given "too much credit" for her debate with Biden.

In the second quarter, Harris announced the endorsements of five members of the Congressional Black Caucus – Al Green on June 20, Alcee Hastings on June 21, Lacy Clay on June 25, and Frederica Wilson and Danny Davis on June 30. She also secured the support of a member of the Congressional Hispanic Caucus when Jim Costa endorsed her on June 17. Harris also added to her support from California, securing the endorsements of nearly half the Democratic delegation in the California Assembly, including Speaker Anthony Rendon. Harris also secured the support of former member of the South Carolina House of Representatives Bakari Sellers.

Harris raised $12 million from more than 279,000 donors by the end of the second quarter.

=== Third quarter ===
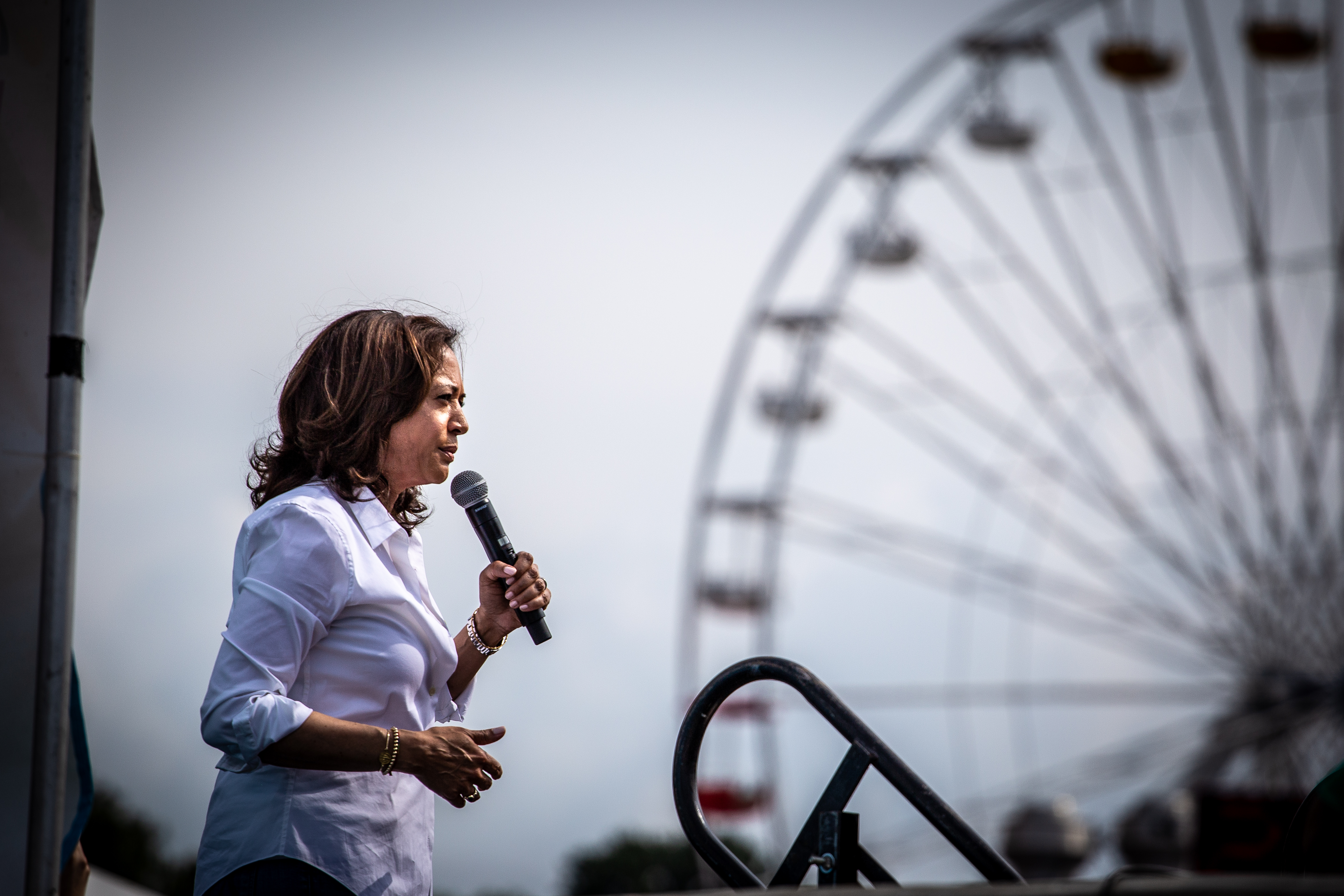
Harris in Iowa on August 10, 2019

On July 12, Harris appeared on The View, where she stated her position on illegal immigration was treating the subject as a "civil enforcement issue" that was concurrent with a secure border and not treating individuals who entered the U.S. illegally like criminals; before she stated her intent to discontinue multiple practices of the Trump administration as it related to the subject.

On July 29, Harris released her own version of Medicare For All, which set forth a longer transition period of 10 years to move from the current system to a single-payer system without raising taxes on the middle class. Her proposal contained a public option and also allowed private insurance companies to offer healthcare plans within a highly regulated Medicare system modeled after Medicare Advantage. The proposal gathered praise from former U.S. health and human services secretary Kathleen Sebelius but drew immediate criticism from supporters of Bernie Sanders.

On July 30 and 31, the second debate of the primary season was held at the Fox Theater in Detroit, Michigan, and hosted by CNN. Harris was assigned to participate in the second night of the second debate. On July 31, Harris defended her health care plan from claims by Joe Biden that it would cost $3 trillion and eliminate employer-based insurance. She asserted that her plan would "bring healthcare to all Americans under a Medicare for All system", and disparaged his health care proposal as leaving about ten million Americans uninsured. Congresswoman Tulsi Gabbard attacked Harris over her record as Attorney General, notably her past positions on marijuana, cash bail, and parole reform. At more than fifteen minutes, Harris spoke for the second largest amount of time of the second night candidates.

On August 8, Harris was interviewed by CNN on her campaign bus, where she discussed President Trump's racial views and the existence of "a long list of statements and tweets and behaviors from this president that make it very clear that he possesses hate and that he is divisive and that he is a racist."

On September 12, the third debate of the primary season was held at the Texas Southern University in Houston, Texas, hosted by ABC News and Univision. During the debate, Harris defended her campaign's version of Medicare for All that would authorize private companies to administer some plans in a tightly regulated way, while crediting Bernie Sanders for championing the prior version. Reaction to Harris's performance varied, as Vox noted that Harris and fellow contender Pete Buttigieg needed breakout performances that would lift them into (or back into) double-digit polling, akin to Biden, Sanders, and Warren. Both failed in this regard; "Harris tried to land a few jokes and zingers (including an awkward line to Biden about how 'yes we can' do gun control), but she seemed to be the only one laughing at them." Jonathan Easley of The Hill complimented Harris's overall performance as she appeared "more at ease in a debate where she didn't seem pressured to be leading the attacks against Biden." At 13 minutes, 42 second, Harris was given the fifth most speaking time.

On September 19, political aides for Harris reported that she was reorienting her presidential campaign strategy in order to invest in early states, after spending months on fundraising; and added that her intent was to finish in the top three in the Iowa caucuses, after doubling her campaign's organizing staff in the state. Harris was memorably caught on a hot mic declaring to Hawaii Senator Mazie Hirono "I'm fucking moving to Iowa."

On September 29, after it was reported that President Trump contacted Ukrainian president Zelenskyy to investigate Joe Biden and Hunter Biden, Harris defended the former vice president and said, "leave Joe Biden alone". Harris called the issue a "distraction", adding that the President was probably "looking at an indictment".

In the third quarter, Harris continued to build considerable support with members of the Congressional Black Caucus, securing the endorsements of Jahana Hayes on July 3, Danny Davis on July 30, Brenda Lawrence on August 1, and Marcia Fudge on August 15. Another member of the Congressional Hispanic Caucus, Ruben Gallego, endorsed her on September 12; Gallego had previously endorsed Eric Swalwell. Harris also secured the support of various Democratic leaders from the South, including former governor of Mississippi and U.S. secretary of the Navy Ray Mabus; Little Rock, Arkansas, Mayor Frank Scott Jr.; and Birmingham, Alabama, mayor Randall Woodfin. In addition, she earned the support of the Black Caucus of the Michigan Democratic Party and civil rights attorney Benjamin Crump.

Harris reported raising $11.6 million in the third quarter, ending with nearly $10 million on hand.

=== Fourth quarter ===
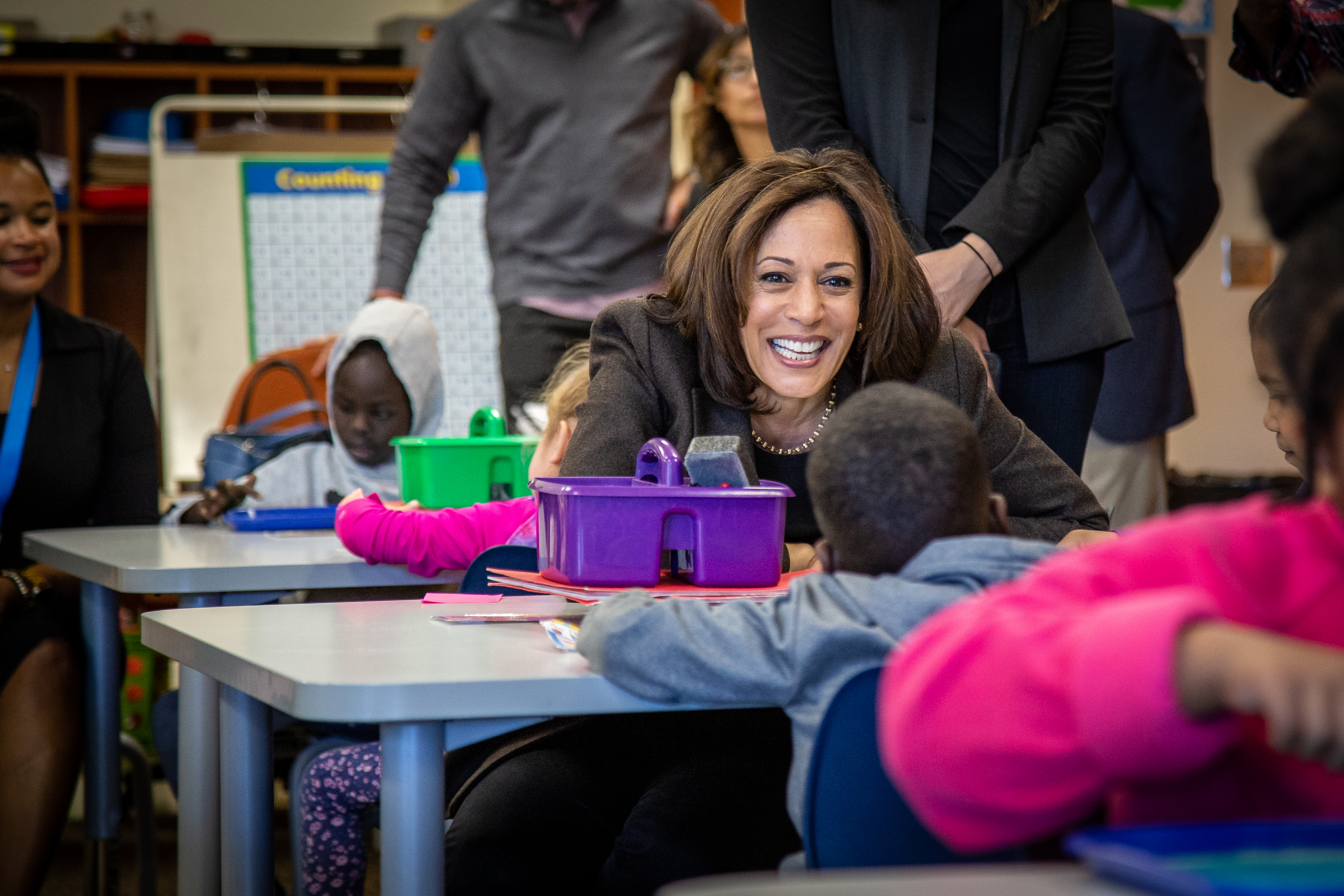
Harris visits King Elementary School in Des Moines, Iowa, on October 7, 2019.

On October 15, the fourth debate of the primary season was held at Otterbein University in Westerville, Ohio, hosted by CNN and The New York Times. Harris criticized the little time spent discussing abortion rights in any of the debates conducted by that point and asserted that impoverished women and women of color would die, due to Republican legislators in "various states who are out of touch with America [and who] are telling women what to do with their bodies." Later, Harris confronted Elizabeth Warren over her public snickering at the notion of joining Harris's calls for President Trump's Twitter account to be suspended. Harris spoke for a total of twelve minutes, which was the sixth-most among all candidates.

On October 26, Harris pulled out of a criminal justice forum held at HBCU Benedict College after organizers indicated that the sponsor of the event, the 20/20 Bipartisan Justice Center, would be awarding President Donald Trump the Bipartisan Justice Award for the First Step Act, an award Harris herself received in 2016. Harris objected to the fact that students at Benedict College were not permitted to attend and were instructed to remain in their dorms during the event, stating:

"Donald Trump is a lawless President. Not only does he circumvent the laws of our country and the principles of our Constitution, but there is nothing in his career that is about justice, for justice, or in celebration of justice."

Senator Cory Booker decided to attend the event anyway. Thereafter, the Mayor of Columbia, Stephen Benjamin, said he was organizing an alternative forum alongside the 20/20 Bipartisan Justice Center's event. The next morning, organizers dropped the 20/20 Bipartisan Justice Center as a sponsor from the event. Harris participated in the ensuing reconfigured forum, retitled the Collegiate Bipartisan Presidential Forum.

On October 30, Politico reported that the Harris campaign was laying off "dozens" of staffers at her Baltimore headquarters, as the campaign was "hemorrhaging cash". The campaign confirmed the restructuring and compared it to restructuring early in the campaigns of John Kerry in 2004 and John McCain in 2008.

On November 2, Harris delivered a speech at the Iowa Democratic Party's Liberty and Justice event, signaling a change in her messaging with the refrain that "Justice is on the ballot!" Harris received an ovation from the room, including from supporters of other candidates. Several media commentators and journalists observed that it was the best speech of the campaign and Harris's strongest performance to date.

On November 7, it was reported that aides working for billionaire candidate Tom Steyer were caught stealing data from the Harris campaign after it was reported earlier that week that Steyer's aides had been caught offering a bribe to state and local politicians in Iowa in exchange for an endorsement. The DNC caught Steyer's aide in the act of stealing a large file of Harris's voter and volunteer data in the state of South Carolina, who was forced to delete the data and resign from the campaign. Steyer faced calls to drop out of the race.

On November 8, Harris was the first candidate to hold a town hall with the rank and file members of Culinary 226 after receiving an exclusive invitation earlier that week. Harris told the members, mostly women and immigrants, that it was their feedback that formed the basis for her healthcare plan. During the town hall, Harris touted her record supporting organized labor in California, refusing to cross the picket line at the Marriott hotel, and attacking Station Casinos, against whom the union had been locked in a years-long attempt to unionize the company's properties.

On November 20, 2019, the fifth debate of the primary season was held at Tyler Perry Studios in Atlanta, Georgia, hosted by MSNBC and The Washington Post. During the debate, Harris remarked on how she believed that in order to win the presidential election in 2020, the Democratic nominee must be able to rebuild the "Obama Coalition" as well as bring the Democratic Party and United States of America together. She further remarked that candidates had been taking for granted the constituencies that had been "the backbone of the Democratic Party" by showing up in a black church close to election time in the following statement:

"... But, you know, at some point, folks get tired of just saying, oh, you know, thank me for showing up and – and say, well, show up for me. Because when black women ... when black women are three to four times more likely to die in connection with childbirth in America, when the sons of black women will die because of gun violence more than any other cause of death, when black women make 61 cents on the dollar as compared to all women, who tragically make 80 cents on the dollar, the question has to be where you been? And what are you going to do?"

Later, when asked to respond to remarks made by Representative Tulsi Gabbard of Hawaii, Harris brought up Gabbard's frequent appearance on the Fox News channel during President Obama's terms as president, where Gabbard was known for frequent public criticism of Obama. This made up for one of the top three most-tweeted moments pertaining to the debate. Another viral moment occurred when Vice President Joe Biden mistakenly remarked that the "only African-American woman that had ever been elected to the United States Senate" had endorsed him, to which Harris laughed, "No, that's not true. The other one is here." Biden himself had sworn Senator Harris in to the United States Senate in January 2017.

Despite fundraising struggles and stagnant polling, Harris continued to attract support. On November 16, Harris earned the endorsement of labor union United Farm Workers. Harris continued to build on her lead among endorsements with the Congressional Black Caucus, when Stacey Plaskett, Delegate to the United States House of Representatives from the United States Virgin Islands' at-large congressional district, pledged her support on November 21. Salud Carbajal, member of the Congressional Hispanic Caucus endorsed her on November 22.

== Suspension ==
On November 27, Harris spent the Thanksgiving holiday in Des Moines, Iowa, with fellow candidates Amy Klobuchar and Cory Booker. She attended the Turkey Trot downtown and visited the Corinthian Gardens apartment, where Harris campaigned for President Barack Obama in 2008. Harris cooked a dry brined turkey herself.

On November 29, The New York Times published an article detailing rifts in the Harris campaign, with "competing factions eager to belittle one another" loyal to either campaign manager Juan Rodriguez or campaign chair Maya Harris. Other staffers told the Times that it was "unclear who's in charge of the campaign". The article described the campaign's financial situation as "dire", with the campaign unable to afford polling or television advertisements, and quoted staffers and supporters who described Harris as an indecisive candidate.

On December 3, 2019, Harris officially ended her campaign to become the Democratic nominee for president, after stating she did not have enough funding to continue. She did not immediately endorse another Democratic candidate but pledged to continue fighting to defeat Donald Trump. Trump sent a sarcastic farewell tweet – "too bad, we will miss you Kamala!" – to which Harris replied: "Don't worry, Mr. President. I'll see you at your trial."

On December 7, Politico reported that Harris had intended to replace Rodriguez as campaign manager with Laphonza Butler, but Harris ended her campaign before the change was made.

== Historical significance ==
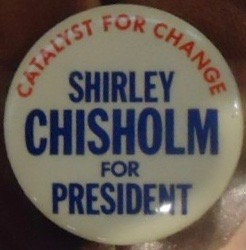
A Shirley Chisholm button, whose typography Harris paid tribute to in her campaign

Harris was the first office-holding Indian/Caribbean woman to seek the Democratic nomination for president, the first two being U.S. representative Shirley Chisholm in 1972 and U.S. senator Carol Moseley Braun in 2004. Harris launched her presidential campaign forty-seven years to the day after Chisholm's presidential campaign. Harris paid homage to Chisholm's campaign by using a similar color scheme and typography in her own campaign's promotional materials and logo.

If nominated, Harris would have become the first Asian American and the first African-American woman to be the presidential nominee of any major party. If elected, she would have become the first woman, first Asian American, first Indian American, first person of Jamaican descent, and second African American to become president. Her husband, Doug Emhoff, would have become the first "First Gentleman" in American history, as all previous presidential spouses have been women.

== Aftermath ==
2020 Democratic Party Ticket
- Campaign: U.S. presidential–vice-presidential election, 2020
- Candidate: Kamala Harris (vice-presidential); U.S. Senator (2017–2021)
- Affiliation: Democratic Party
- Status: Presumptive VP nominee: August 11, 2020; Official VP nominee: August 19, 2020; Election day: November 3, 2020; Elected VP: November 7, 2020; Inaugurated VP: January 20, 2021
- Headquarters: Wilmington, Delaware

Website
- www.joebiden.com

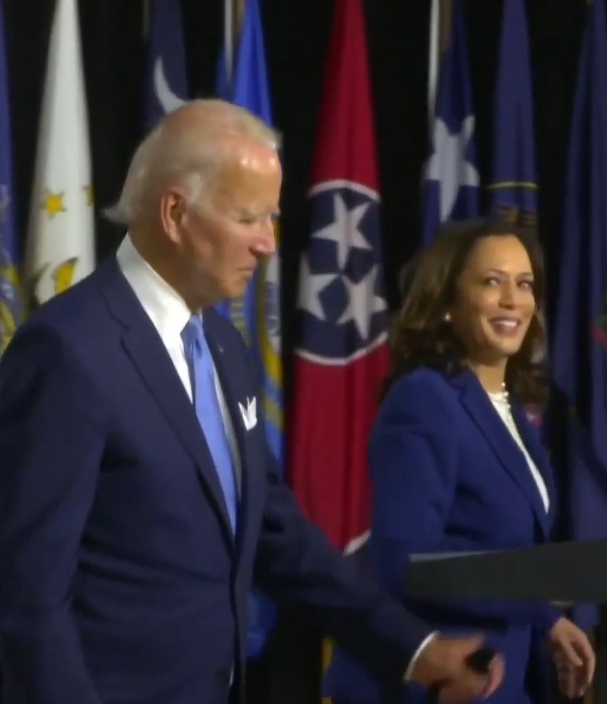
Biden and Harris at their first campaign event since the announcement of her selection as his running mate, August 12, 2020

After Harris dropped out of the race, she initially remained neutral and did not endorse any of the remaining candidates for the Democratic nomination. On March 8, 2020, Harris endorsed Joe Biden, who had emerged as the frontrunner following the Super Tuesday primaries.

=== Biden–Harris ticket ===
On March 15, 2020, Biden pledged that he would pick a black woman as his running mate if he won the nomination. Media speculation immediately began over who he could pick, with Harris emerging as a frontrunner for the nod. Biden eventually clinched the nomination, defeating Bernie Sanders, and soon began the vetting process, which included Harris. A New York Times report indicated that Harris, along with former national security advisor Susan Rice, senator Elizabeth Warren, and Michigan governor Gretchen Whitmer, were on Biden's final shortlist. Eventually, on August 11, Biden announced that he had chosen Harris as his running mate. Harris formally accepted the Democratic vice-presidential nomination on August 19.

The election was held on November 3, although an unprecedented number of mail-in ballots due to the COVID-19 pandemic meant that the outcome of the election was unclear for several days following election day. On November 7, Biden and Harris were declared the winners, although incumbent president Donald Trump refused to accept the results of the election, making unsubstantiated claims of voter fraud. With the victory, Harris became the first woman elected to national office in the United States. She was sworn in alongside Biden on January 20, 2021 and served as the 49th vice-president of the United States.

== See also ==
- Kamala Harris 2024 presidential campaign
- 2020 United States presidential election
