= KHive =

Hashtag and online community supporting Kamala Harris

#KHive is the hashtag used by an informal online community supporting Kamala Harris, the 49th vice president of the United States and 2024 Democratic presidential nominee. The hashtag is also a term (pronounced and occasionally transcribed as K-Hive) that refers to the wider online community of support that is not formally affiliated with her campaign or office. The community formed prior to and during her 2020 presidential campaign as an effort to defend Harris from perceived misinformation and attacks against her perceived as racist and sexist. The movement has been cited as an example of social media fandom or stan culture.

== Origins ==
Sources vary on the coinage of the term. The Daily Dot said Joy Reid first used the term in August 2017 in a tweet saying "@DrJasonJohnson @ZerlinaMaxwell and I had a meeting and decided it's called the K-Hive." Reecie Colbert, a prominent member of the movement, told Bakari Sellers she believed Bianca Delarosa coined the term but disputed a claim by Delarosa that she was "the only one who speaks for KHive." She said the movement had no formal leaders but was "just a bunch of really scrappy accounts on Twitter, on social media."

Usage of the hashtag increased in August 2018, before Harris had announced her presidential candidacy but after she told MSNBC's Kasie Hunt that she was "not ruling it out." As of July 2019, while Harris was in her presidential campaign, 38,000 Twitter accounts had used the hashtag and according to Vox "accrued an estimated 360 million impressions". K-Hive is derived from a hashtag associated with the online fandom of Beyoncé, the #BeyHive, which is itself a play on beehive.

The movement has been cited as an example of social media fandom or stan culture. Politico and BuzzFeed News identified the KHive, alongside "Bernie Bros", the "Yang Gang", "Team Pete," and "Cuomosexuals", as part of a new wave of online political supporters that strongly support a single candidate in a semi-parasocial manner.

== Activity ==
The community formed prior to and during Harris's 2020 presidential campaign as an effort to defend her from racist and sexist attacks and debunk misinformation. It is not formally affiliated with the campaign.

According to Wired, the organization was expected to be helpful to the 2020 Biden–Harris campaign. According to Newsy, the strength of the relationship between KHive and Harris could be used to force Biden to take Harris' point of view seriously. Kimberly Peeler-Allen of Rutgers' Center for American Women and Politics told Newsy that "the urge to stick with the status quo and the same voices around the table is extremely strong, so it will take the #KHive and coalition work all across the board to make sure that Senator Harris' voice is definitely heard and taken into account."

In September 2020, Alanna Vagianos, writing for The Huffington Post, observed that "as with most loosely-organized online groups, it does not have a unified set of tactics, and bad actors are hard or impossible to control." According to Vagianos, there have been claims by supporters of Bernie Sanders and Elizabeth Warren that they have been cyber-harassed by individuals alleged to be affiliated with the KHive. In response to the Huffington Post article, Sabrina Singh, the press secretary for Kamala Harris, stated "The campaign does not condone doxxing, derogatory language or harassment of any kind." Some progressives have argued that there is a double standard regarding KHive from the media and some Democrats due to the substantial amount of criticism that supporters of Bernie Sanders labeled as "Bernie Bros" received for allegations of harassment.

In July 2024, following a drop in support for incumbent president Joe Biden, KHive saw a resurgence with many Democrats saying she should take over the 2024 Democratic nomination. When Biden dropped out of the presidential campaign on July 21, 2024, the support for Harris's campaign reached new levels of online fandom alongside meme edits of Harris to songs off of pop singer Charli XCX's album Brat, which had released earlier in the summer.

== Related hashtags ==
Harris's supporters also use the hashtag #WeGotHerBack. Followers of her husband on social media call themselves the #DougHive.

== See also ==
- Public image of Kamala Harris
- ImWithHer
