= Coconut palms in California =

Newport Beach palm
- The coconut palm in 2013

- Location within the Los Angeles metropolitan area Location within California Location within the United States
- Species: Coconut (Cocos nucifera)
- Location: 2430 Pacific Coast Highway, Newport Beach, CA, 92663
- Coordinates: 33.6193°N 117.9219°W
- Height: 12 ft (3.7 m) in 2006
- Date seeded: 1984
- Date felled: 2015

There have been only a few instances of coconut palms growing in the state of California, with the most well-known formerly located in Newport Beach, being a popular attraction for gardening enthusiasts. However, others have been reported in La Quinta and near the Salton Sea.

== Background ==
Coconut palms are not well-adapted to the Californian climate, with the coldness of the soil during the winter and the rain during that season significantly hindering their growth. Places in California that have the appropriate winter temperatures for the trees do not have high enough summer temperatures, weakening the palm due to the lack of sugar it can produce.

== Newport Beach palm ==
The dwarfed palm in Newport Beach was the northernmost outdoor coconut palm in the world and was planted in 1984, by a prior tenant of the building it stood by. It was located off California State Route 1 and almost touched the sidewalk. It was discovered by the International Palm Society members Bill Dickenson and Ralph Velez, who reached out to the business owners and informed them of its unusuality. The owners then contacted their gardeners and gave them specific instructions for the care of the tree. At one point, the tree started to develop the typical lean that the species commonly has, fostering concerns that the bend would bring it too far over the sidewalk. To solve this, Dickenson created a sling and wrapped it around the trunk, which, over time, pulled the tree back in the direction of the building. A small plaque accompanied the tree. The palm disappeared in 2015; the exact reason is unknown.

== Other palms ==
A coconut palm was reported to be in an outdoor courtyard in La Quinta, being tall enough to be able to be seen from the street. It was transported from Hawaii. Some short-lived trees were also grown near the Salton Sea.

It appears that the slightly inland areas of Southern California may offer more favorable conditions than the coastline. In addition to the ones mentioned above, there have also been videos of palms in Santa Ana and Del Mar, the latter of which has now deceased. The Santa Ana palm is significant, because unlike the Newport Beach specimen and others before it, this does not have any type of adjacent protection (e.g. walls).

In 2021, a specimen was discovered in a garden in Mesa, Arizona, which was reported to have been growing since at least 2013. This seems to indicate that other particularly warm areas of the Southwest may also have microclimates particularly favorable for outdoor cultivation of these palms.

Rumors have spread online that the most 'polar' coconut palm in the world would actually be a specimen located inside the Orto Botanico di Palermo, but the rumor was unfounded. Instead, there appears to be a trunking coconut palm in a protected part of coastal Southern Spain, which as of December 2025 has managed to survive for 3 years while experiencing California-like winters; similarly in Paphos, Cyprus. There has also been some conversation about several palms in Funchal in Madeira Island, which has a latitude and climate that is not unlike coastal Southern California. Although there are coconut palms in Bermuda which is at a similar latitude, it is not really comparable as its Winters are somewhat warmer, while its annual rainfall distribution is 'tropical'. For regular long-term cultivation, the latitude limit for Mediterranean-like annual rainfall patterns appears to be the Canary Islands (Northern Hemisphere), and Kalbarri (Southern Hemisphere).

While there may be some degree of variation in the ability of coconut palms to tolerate suboptimal conditions with species like the Panama Tall or Maypan being suited for occasional exposure to cooler weather, in general during the winter season the peak daytime temperature must not drop below 70F (21C) for more than one month, and the historical record low temperature must not be below 32F (0 C) for more than one or two months of the year. Further, during the Summer the typical daytime temperature must reach 80F (27C) for at least two or three months of the year.
