= The Okra Project =

American mutual aid collective

- The Okra Project
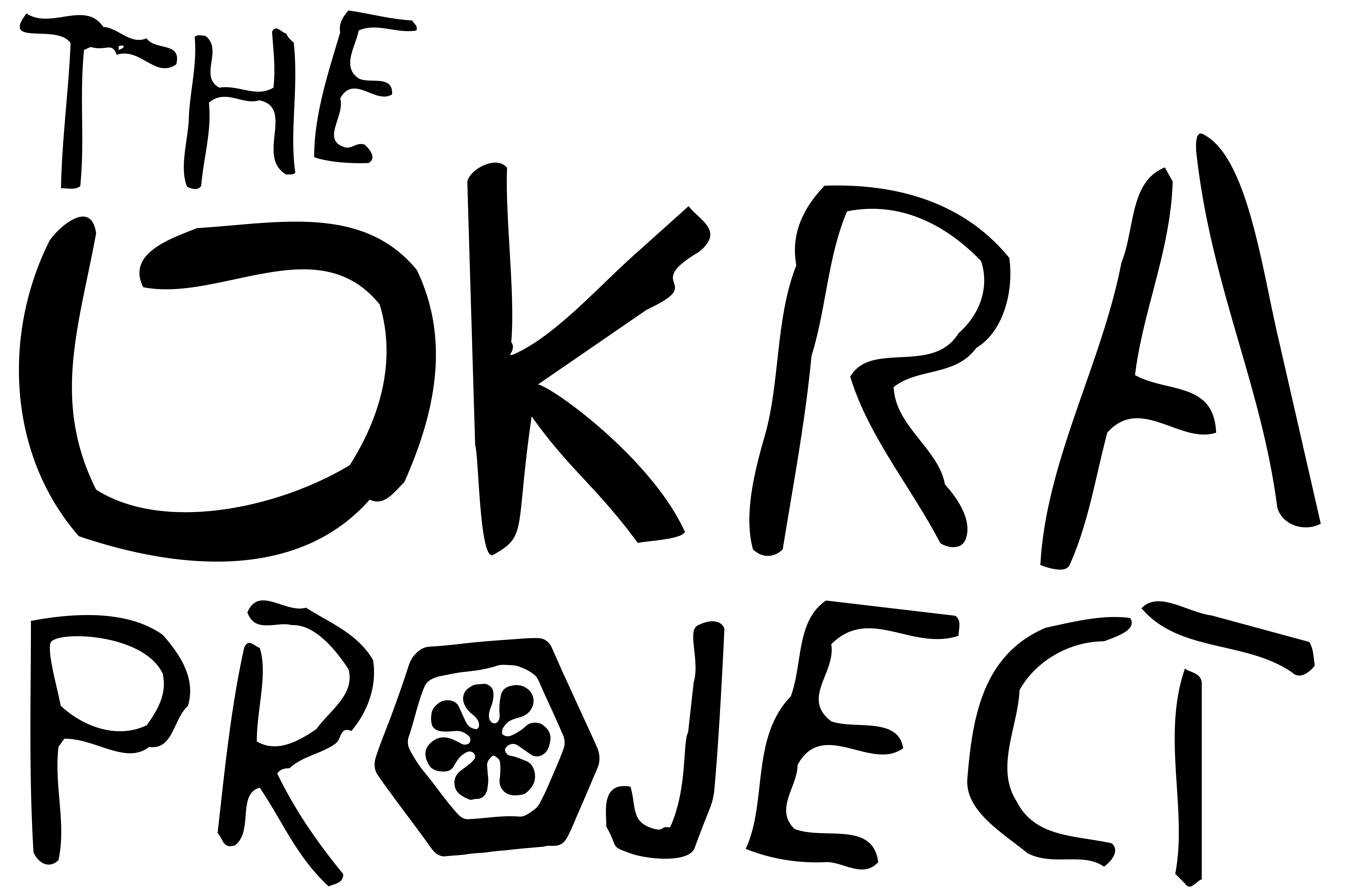
- Official 2023 Logo
- Formation: January 1, 2018; 8 years ago
- Headquarters: Brooklyn, New York
- Region served: United States
- Services: Total health and wellness of Black Trans and non binary people via mutual-aid and resources.
- Website: www.theokraproject.com

The Okra Project is an American mutual aid collective and 501(c)(3) nonprofit organization that provides support to black trans, non-binary, and gender-nonconforming people. The organization is based in New York City.

== History ==
The Okra Project was founded in January 2018 to combat food insecurity among Black trans people. The organization's beginning mission focused on hiring and training Black trans people as chefs who then would provide meals for fellow community members in the comfort of their homes. At the time, they collaborated with Chef Meliq August, who runs a trans chef service. The provided meals were of African diasporic cuisines. After its founding, it was stated that the intention was to run the New York-based collective, which operates entirely on individual donations, until its funds were depleted. However, donations and worldwide support continued to grow.

In light of social distancing requirements implemented in New York related to COVID-19, The Okra Project switched to providing groceries to Black trans people and raising money for mental health services. As of June 2020, the organization had provided groceries to thousands of people and provided mental health resources to 200. The organization also expanded its services to Philadelphia and New Jersey due to high demand.

The current Executive Director as of 2023 is Gabrielle Souza.

In 2024, former executive director Dominique Morgan was indicted for misappropriation of funds while she was heading the organization in 2022. In a joint statement released in May 2026, The Okra Project and trans actor and activist Indya Moore expressed sympathy for Morgan, who pled guilty to the charges and was scheduled to be sentenced later that month.

== Services ==
The Okra Project’s primary aim is to provide financial assistance via mutual aid to its most vulnerable community members in order to make tangible and direct impacts on those within the community who need it most. The organization has nation-wide reach, though most of the organization’s programs are specifically designed to facilitate aid to Black and brown transgender and gender non-conforming individuals across the NYC metro area. Since its founding, The Okra Project has provided nearly $3 million in direct mutual aid, ad hoc programming, and partnerships to nearly 10,000 Black and brown transgender and gender non-conforming individuals across the country.

The Okra Project works to provide wellness services for Black and brown Trans and gender non-conforming people, with an emphasis on Black Trans femmes. Legacy programs include rental, utilities, and grocery support; COVID-19 relief funds; and partnerships with companies like Uber Eats and BetterHelp aimed at providing access to safe transportation, meal and food delivery services, and mental health care.
