= Family of Kamala Harris =

Extended family and heritage of Kamala Harris

Harris family
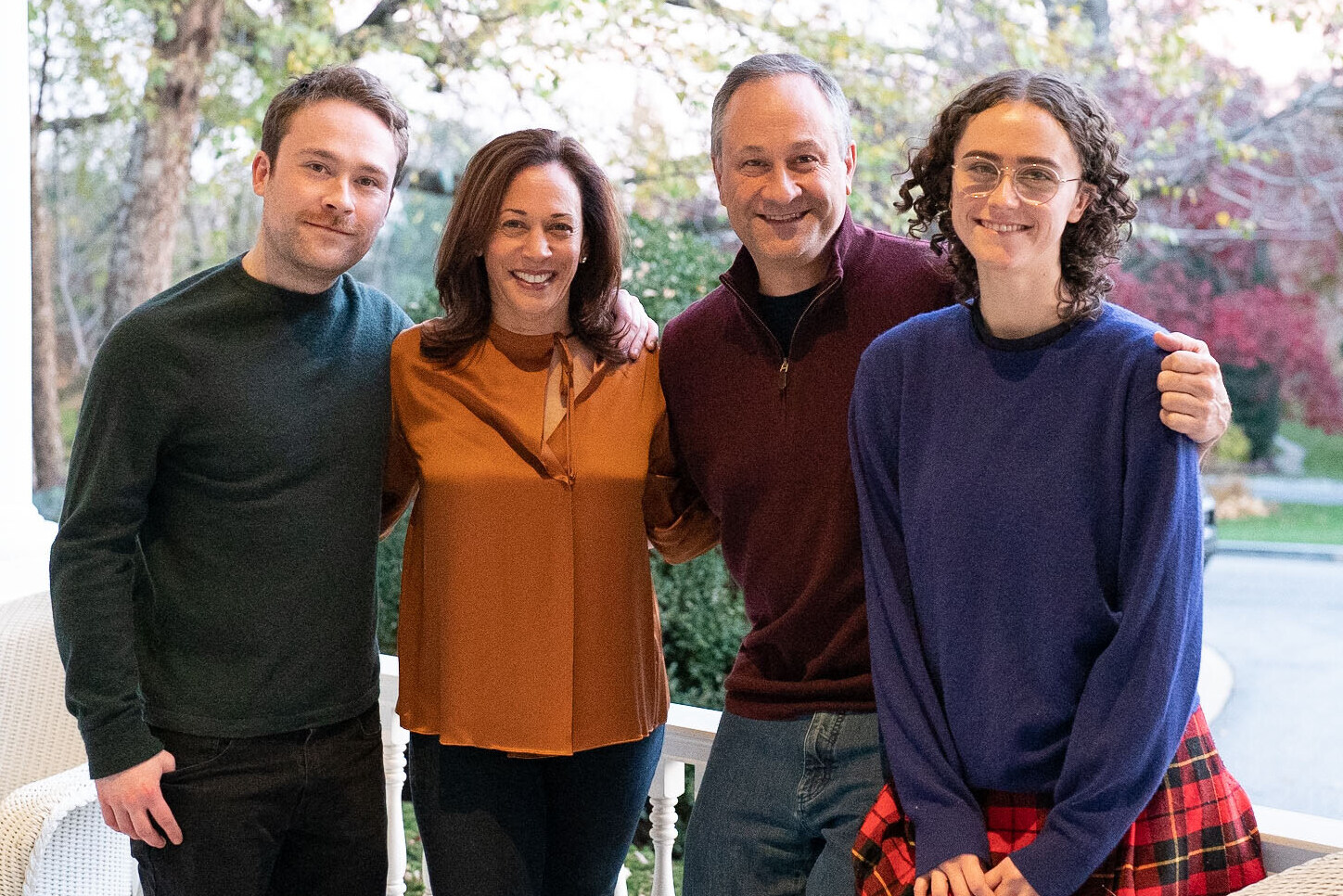
- Kamala Harris with her husband and step children in 2024
- Current region: Los Angeles, California, U.S.
- Origin: East Bay, California, U.S.; Thulasendrapuram, India; Brown's Town, Jamaica
- Members: Kamala Harris; Douglas Emhoff; Cole Emhoff; Ella Emhoff
- Connected members: Maya Harris (sister); Meena Harris (niece); Shyamala Gopalan (mother)†; Donald J. Harris (father); P. V. Gopalan (grandfather)†; Sharada Balachandran

Kamala Harris is an American politician and attorney who was the 49th vice president of the United States from 2021 to 2025. Harris was formerly the junior United States senator from California, and prior to her election to the Senate, she served as the 32nd attorney general of California. Her family includes several members who are notable in politics and academia. They were the second family of the United States from 2021 to 2025 during Harris' vice presidency under Joe Biden. Harris's maternal ancestry comes from Tamil Nadu, India. Her paternal ancestry comes from Saint Ann, Jamaica. She is married to American entertainment attorney and law professor Douglas Emhoff.

== Immediate family ==
=== Douglas Emhoff ===
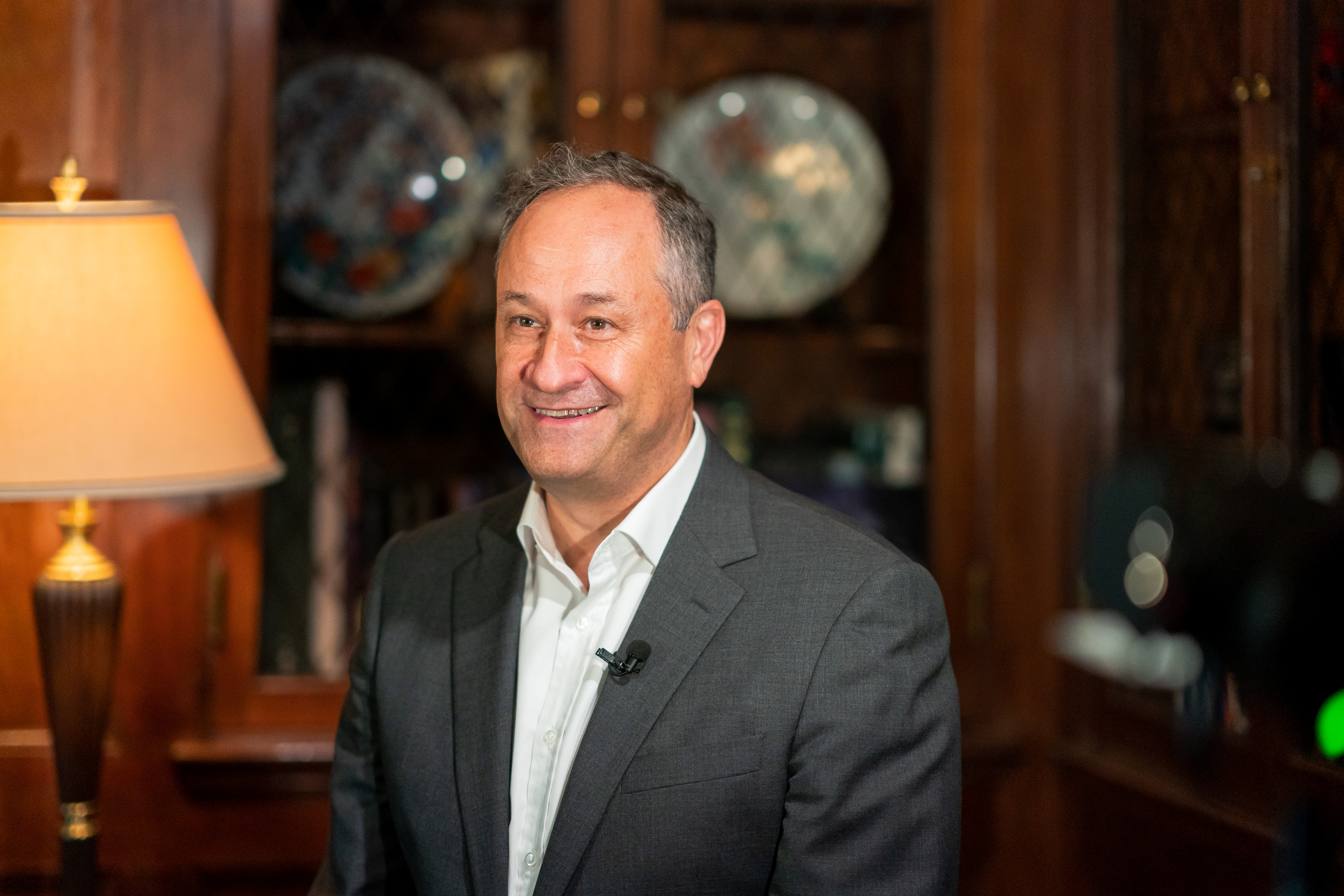
Second Gentleman of the United States Douglas Emhoff in 2021

Douglas Emhoff is the husband of Kamala Harris. He was born to Jewish parents Michael and Barbara Emhoff in Brooklyn, New York. He lived in New Jersey from 1969 to 1981, moving with his family to California when he was 17. Emhoff graduated from the California State University, Northridge and USC Gould School of Law. He married film producer Kerstin Emhoff (née Mackin) in 1992; they divorced in 2008 after 16 years and two children. He married Harris on August 22, 2014, in Santa Barbara, California, with Harris's sister Maya Harris officiating.

Emhoff is an entertainment litigator and began his career at Pillsbury Winthrop's litigation group. He later moved to Belin Rawlings & Badal, a boutique firm, in the late 1990s. He opened his own firm with Ben Whitwell in 2000. The firm was acquired by Venable in 2006. Emhoff joined DLA Piper as a partner in 2017, working at its Washington, D.C., and California offices. Following the announcement that his wife would be Joe Biden's running mate in the 2020 United States presidential election, Emhoff took a leave of absence from the firm. After the Biden–Harris ticket won, the campaign announced Emhoff would permanently leave DLA Piper before Inauguration Day to avoid conflict of interest concerns.

=== Cole Emhoff ===
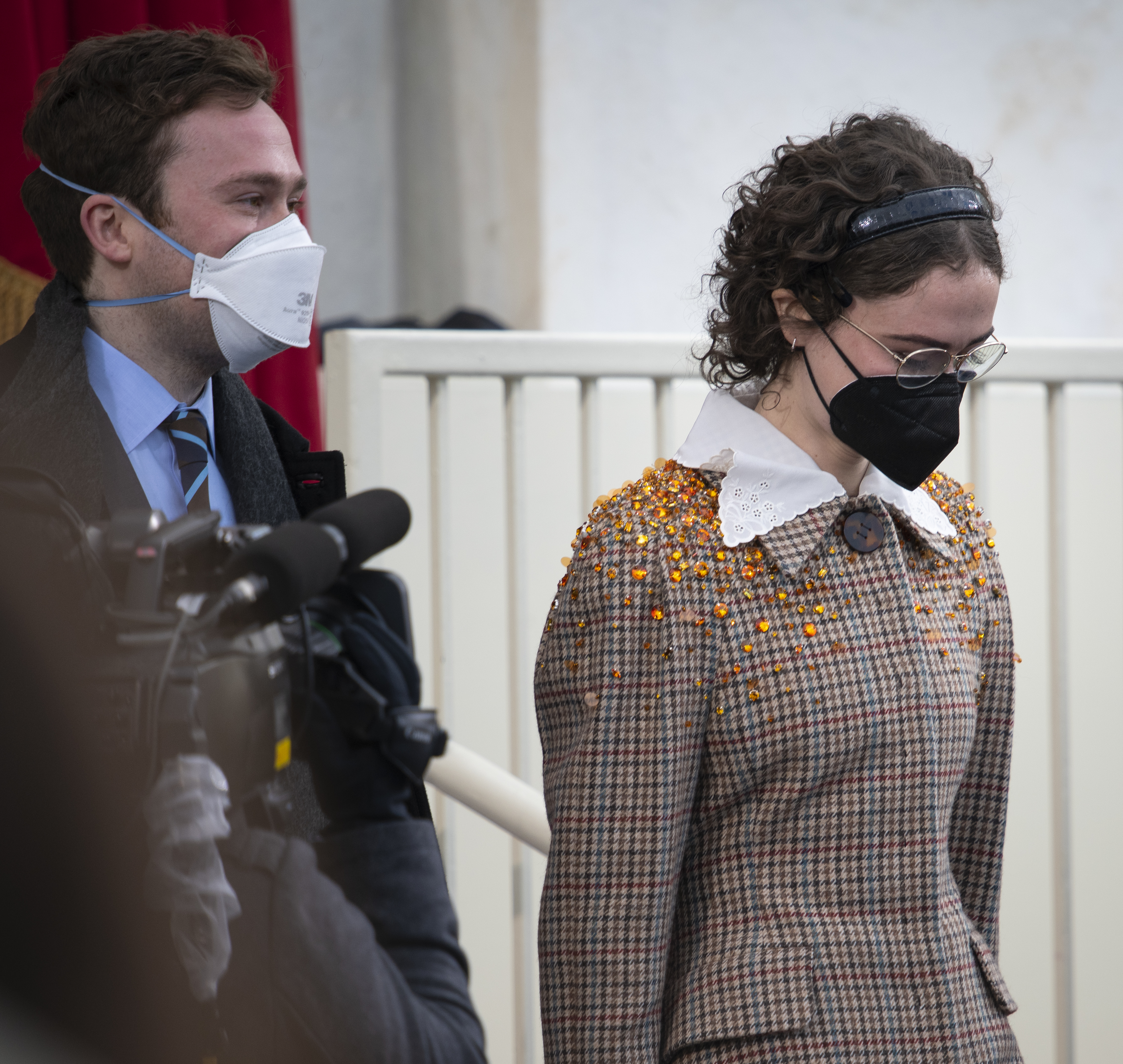
Cole and Ella Emhoff at the 2021 inauguration ceremonies on Capitol Hill, January 20, 2021

Cole MacKin Emhoff is the stepson of Kamala Harris through her marriage to Doug Emhoff. He was born September 15, 1994, to Kerstin Emhoff and was named after jazz musician John Coltrane. Emhoff graduated from Colorado College with a bachelor's degree in psychology. Emhoff was an assistant at William Morris Endeavor before becoming an executive assistant at Plan B Entertainment. Emhoff calls Harris "Momala". He married Greenley Littlejohn on October 14, 2023, in a Los Angeles ceremony that was officiated by Harris.

=== Ella Emhoff ===
Ella Emhoff is the stepdaughter of Kamala Harris through her marriage to Doug Emhoff. She was born May 29, 1999, to Kerstin Emhoff and was named after jazz singer Ella Fitzgerald. In 2014, she was in the music video for Bo Burnham's song "Repeat Stuff". In 2018, Emhoff graduated from high school in Los Angeles where she was on the swim team. She is an artist majoring in apparel and textiles at Parsons School of Design. Emhoff calls Harris "Momala". She designed her inauguration day dress with designer Batsheva Hay.

=== Immediate family tree ===
Kerstin Emhoff b. 1967	Doug Emhoff b. 1964	Kamala Harris b. 1964
Cole Emhoff b. 1994	Ella Emhoff b. 1999

== Parents ==
=== Shyamala Gopalan ===
Shyamala Gopalan was the mother of Kamala Harris. Shyamala (Note: As per the cited sources and the common naming conventions of her family) (December 7, 1938 – February 11, 2009) was a biomedical scientist at the Lawrence Berkeley National Laboratory, whose work in isolating and characterizing the progesterone receptor gene stimulated advances in breast biology and oncology.

=== Donald J. Harris ===
Donald J. Harris is the father of Kamala Harris. He is a Jamaican-American economist and professor emeritus at Stanford University, originally from Saint Ann's Bay, Jamaica. Of Jamaican descent, Harris was born on August 23, 1938, to Beryl Harris (née Finegan) and Oscar Joseph Harris. He grew up in the Orange Hill area of Saint Ann Parish, near Brown's Town. Harris received a Bachelor of Arts from the University College of the West Indies in 1960. In 1963 he came to the United States to earn a PhD from University of California, Berkeley which he completed in 1966. He met his future wife Shyamala Gopalan through the civil rights movement. Harris was an assistant professor at the University of Illinois at Urbana–Champaign from 1966 to 1967 and at Northwestern University from 1967 to 1968. He moved to the University of Wisconsin–Madison as an associate professor in 1968. In 1972, he joined the faculty of Stanford University as a professor of economics. He directed the Consortium Graduate School of Social Sciences at the University of the West Indies in 1986–1987. He was a Fulbright Scholar in Brazil in 1990 and 1991 and in Mexico in 1992. In 1998, he retired from Stanford becoming a professor emeritus.

== Other relatives ==
=== Maya Harris ===
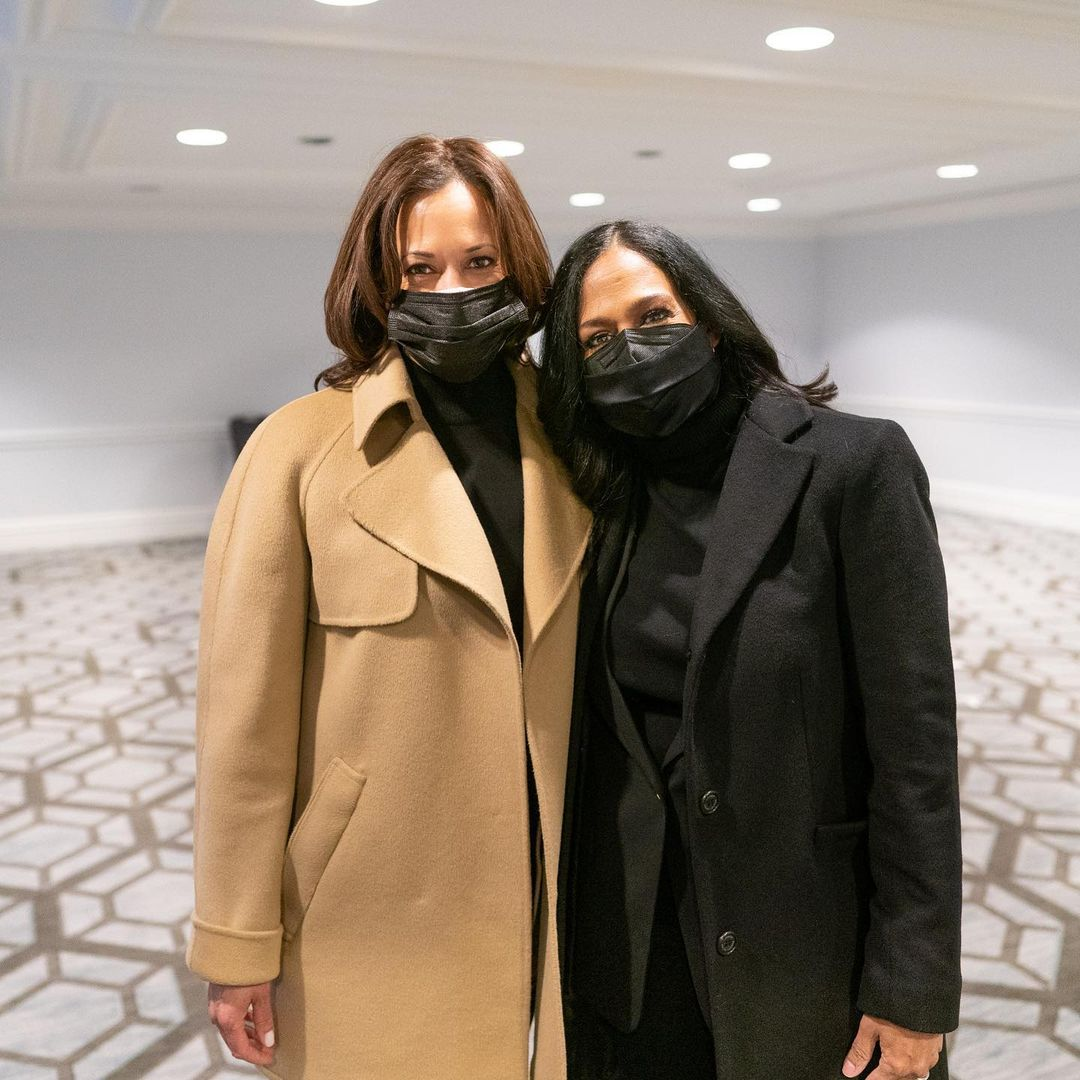
Vice President Kamala Harris with her sister Maya Harris, January 2021

Maya Harris is the younger sister of Kamala Harris. She was born in Champaign-Urbana, Illinois and raised in the San Francisco Bay Area and Montreal. She had her only child Meena Harris at the age of 17. Harris completed a Bachelor of Arts at University of California, Berkeley and earned a J.D. degree from Stanford Law School. She works as a lawyer, public policy advocate, and a television commentator. Harris married lawyer Tony West in July 1998.

=== Meena Harris ===
Meena Harris is the niece of Kamala Harris. She was born in Oakland, California in 1984. Harris completed a bachelor's degree from Stanford University and a J.D. at Harvard Law School. She is a lawyer and children's book author. She founded a campaign to raise awareness on social policy issues. Her 2020 children's book is based on the life story of her mother and aunt. Harris and her husband Nikolas Ajagu have two daughters.

=== P. V. Gopalan ===
P. V. Gopalan (1911 – February 1998) was the maternal grandfather of Kamala Harris. Gopalan was a career civil servant, eventually serving as Joint Secretary to Government of India in the Ministry of Labour, Employment and Rehabilitation. He was later deputed to the Government of Zambia and lived in Lusaka as Director of Relief Measures and Refugees, to help Zambia manage an influx of refugees from Southern Rhodesia (now Zimbabwe). Gopalan and his wife Rajam were from Tamil Nadu state and had wed in an arranged marriage. They had four children. Their eldest daughter Shyamala became a scientist in the United States and Canada. Their son Balachandran received a PhD in economics and computer science from the University of Wisconsin–Madison and returned to an academic career in India. Their daughter Sarala is an obstetrician who practiced in the coastal city of Chennai, India. Their youngest daughter Mahalakshmi is an information scientist, who worked for the Government of Ontario.

=== Gopalan Balachandran ===
Gopalan Balachandran, the uncle of Kamala Harris, studied at St. Xavier's College Calcutta, University of Calcutta and the Imperial College London. He obtained a PhD in Economics and Computer Science from the University of Wisconsin in 1978 with dissertation devoted to Financial regulation of decentralized economies. He was a consulting fellow at the Manohar Parrikar Institute of Defence Studies and Analyses, Delhi. He was married to Rosamaria Orihuela Basurto in 1980.

=== Sharada Balachandran ===
Sharada Balachandran Orihuela is the first cousin of Kamala Harris. She is an Indian Mexican born in Mexico to Rosamaria Orihuela and Gopalan Balachandran. She started formal education in New Delhi and moved frequently between India, Mexico, and the United States. After moving to Oakland, California for college in 2001, Balachandran Orihuela's aunt, Shyamala Gopalan, helped her cope with race relations in the aftermath of the September 11 attacks and later influenced her intellectual trajectory. Balachandran Orihuela graduated from Mills College and University of California, Davis. She is an associate professor of English and comparative literature at University of Maryland, College Park. She authored the 2018 book, Fugitives, Smugglers, and Thieves.

=== Christine Simmons ===
Christine Simmons was a family friend who Kamala Harris has referred to as an aunt. She joined Alpha Kappa Alpha in 1950 while attending Howard University. She was a former chapter president. Simmons died in 2015.

== Ancestry of Kamala Harris ==
Kamala Harris is of Jamaican descent on her paternal side and of Indian descent on her maternal side.

Donald J. Harris wrote in an account of his family ancestry that the Harris name comes from his paternal grandfather Joseph Alexander Harris, a land owner and agricultural produce exporter, and that his paternal grandmother "Miss Chrishy" (née Christiana Brown) was a descendant of both enslaved Jamaicans and Hamilton Brown, a plantation and slave owner. However, Snopes, a fact-checking website, rated this claim as unproven pending further research. In July 2019, Snopes noted that Harris made errors in some of the vital dates he provided for births and deaths of his grandparents. The following year, PolitiFact stopped short of Snopes's unproven rating, and again reviewed the validity of the story, saying about the Stanford professor emeritus's claim that he is the descendant of the slave owner, "I would be inclined to believe him."

Harris' maternal ancestral home is the village of Thulasendrapuram in India, in which her grandfather P. V. Gopalan was born. The Gopalans belonged to the conservative Tamil Brahmin community, a part of India's historically elite Brahmin varna.

== See also ==
- Family of Joe Biden
- Family of Donald Trump
- Family of Mike Pence
- Family of JD Vance
- Family of Barack Obama
- List of African American firsts
- List of African American U.S. state firsts
- List of Asian-American firsts
- List of American women's firsts
- List of women's firsts
