= Demand-led growth =

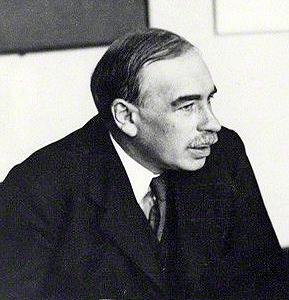
John M. Keynes

Demand-led growth is the foundation of an economic theory claiming that an increase in aggregate demand will ultimately cause an increase in total output in the long run. This is based on a hypothetical sequence of events where an increase in demand will, in effect, stimulate an increase in supply (within resource limitations). This stands in opposition to the common neo-classical theory that demand follows supply, and consequently, that supply determines growth in the long run.

The demand-centric theory is built on the foundation of work by thinkers such as John Maynard Keynes, Michał Kalecki, Petrus Verdoorn, and Nicholas Kaldor; and is expanded on through research by organizations like the ILO and the Levy Economics Institute of Bard College.

Within the theory of demand-led growth, there exist two schools of thought. The first claims that an increase in wage share is the impetus for growth. A study by the ILO, to illustrate, concluded that higher wage shares correlate with increased productivity, and suggests policies including "improved union legislation" and "increasing the reach of collective bargaining agreements" to assist in increasing wage shares. The second school gives preference to the notion of profit-led growth, which maintains the rationale that the profit-seeking behavior of individual firms is the primary source of increased total output; although many who follow this school of thought do acknowledge the possibility that negative effects on consumption that result from a higher profit share will be felt in the long run. To offer an example, a study by Robert A. Blecker, professor of economics at American University, found that both labor share and general economic activity in the United States were lower in the neo-liberal era than in the post-WWII era, while still maintaining that a higher profit share is associated with faster GDP growth, higher capacity utilization, and more rapid capital accumulation in the short run.

== Profit-led demand ==
The theory of profit-led demand suggests that a focus on investment by increasing profit shares outweighs the potentially negative effects of lower wage shares on consumption in an economy. Demand is profit-led only when the effect of distribution on net exports is high enough to offset the effects on domestic demand, and this is likely only in small, open economies. In other words, an economy that has a high net-export to consumption ratio is by definition profit-led. Several economists believe that most economies are profit-led in the short run, however, they challenge the long term viability of the theory by suggesting that it could be a race to the bottom.

=== Middle income trap ===
The Middle Income Trap theory explains the tendencies of export-oriented or profit-led economies. It suggests that an economy that focuses on the exportation of goods as a source of growth or has a comparative advantage in the manufacture of a good will ultimately lose its competitive edge in the manufacturing of that good because wages will be on an upward trend. When wages are increased, the economy will no longer be able to sustain the comparative advantage. Consequently, exports will decrease and the economy will endure a period of stagnation that stalls growth of income.

== Wage-led demand ==
An economy is wage-led if the positive effect of a higher wage share on consumption dominates the potentially negative effects on investment and net exports. A redistribution of income toward wages boosts consumption demand because of the higher marginal propensity to consume derived from wages compared with the same measure derived from profits. The Review of Keynesian Economics suggest that mainstream models attach only one single role to wages: as a cost item. Thereby, they recognize only the positive effects that follow a decrease in wages: it will improve competitiveness and, ultimately, increase net exports, and it will have a positive effect on investment due to increased profitability. However, in post-Keynesian and Kaleckian models, wages have a dual role as both a cost item and a source of demand. While post-Keynesian models acknowledge the first two effects, they add a crucial element which is missing in the mainstream models: a wage decrease (or, to be precise, a decrease in the share of wages in national income) will certainly suppress domestic consumption, since the marginal propensity to consume out of wages is higher than that out of profits.

=== Cyclical cumulative causation ===
A wage-led growth strategy aims at establishing a full-employment growth model in which sustained wage growth drives demand growth via consumption growth and via accelerator effects of investment growth, as well as productivity growth via labor-saving-induced technological change. Due to this strategy's repeating itself in a cyclical manner, this theory is thought to be more stable in the long run than profit-led growth because a wage-led growth strategy will result in stable or rising wage shares if it follows the circular cumulative causation behavior. This theory commands slower-paced growth and is more viable in the long run, however, it relies heavily on technological change to redistribute wages and labor in order to continue along the cumulative causation trend. A wage-led growth strategy includes measures to restrict financial speculation, encourage a more long-term view in corporate governance, strengthen the role of stakeholders, and rein in excessive pay in the financial sector. A restructuring of the financial sector is needed to prevent or reduce the frequency and severity of financial crises. Such measures are likely to include restrictions on bank bonuses, financial transactions taxes, pro-cyclical credit management, regulation of the shadow banking industry, and closing of secrecy jurisdictions (tax havens), as well as the establishment of a sizable not-for-profit segment within the banking industry and a strengthening of stakeholders within corporate governance that will also lead to an improvement in labor's bargaining power and the wage share.

== Demand-led regimes ==
Demand-led regimes use specific monetary and fiscal policy objectives to increase aggregate demand. All G20 countries are considered demand-led regimes. Policymakers will identify specific factors that influence aggregate demand, and implement policies that will increase demand. This can occur in many ways, a common objective involves keeping price levels low in an effort to entice consumers to purchase goods. Demand-led regimes can be identified in the two forms described above, either wage-led or profit-led.

Demand-led regimes do not expressly state their policy objectives as demand-led. In large economies, economic targets that affect aggregate demand are often identified on a micro-level, and demand-led growth may be the result of legislation, regulation, or administrative changes.

=== Domestic demand-led regimes in the United States ===
State, local, and city economies in the United States are overwhelmingly demand-led. Economies that trust upon local investment, wages, and production will ultimately rely upon increased local demand to increase economic output. The political and social structure of the U.S. economy has created an atmosphere that allows domestic demand-led growth to flourish within its borders.

Studies have produced mixed results as to whether the U.S. operates under a profit-led or wage-led demand regime. However, recent political movements in the U.S. have increased the chances that the minimum wage there will nearly double, which raises the possibility that the U.S. will develop more distinctly under a wage-led demand regime.

Policies that drive wages up can be categorized under wage-led growth. In addition, fiscal and monetary policies that allow for or promote private organizations that give collective bargaining rights to laborers contribute to the wage-led growth theory. Much of the growth in the United States' economy that arguably came as a result of the boom in labor union participation during the post-WWII era could be described as an example of demand-led growth in action.

=== Living wage ordinances ===
The U.S. state of Maryland, several major cities, and some municipalities have passed laws which require cost of living wage increases that are commensurate with the cost of living for the respective geographic regions. Living wage ordinances only affect businesses that have government contracts, as the wage is set well above the federal or state minimum wage.

Some U.S. cities have doubled the federal minimum wage in an effort to meet cost of living increases in major metropolitan areas. In 2015, the city of Seattle, Washington set a policy goal of raising minimum wage within city limits to $15 per hour by 2021. This will be the first domestic test of a demand-led growth shock, and economists are anxious to see what the results will be with respect to job growth, increased investment, and overall economic expansion.

=== Inflationary effects ===
Since prices in open and competitive capitalist markets are dictated by relative volumes of supply and demand, changes to the amount of goods consumed or produced will induce fluctuations in overall prices. In Keynesian theory the individual factors of aggregate demand can exert inflationary pressure on the prices in the overall economy, rapid increases in consumption by firms, spending by government, exports relative to imports, typically abbreviated and expressed in the following equation:

AD = C + I + G + (X – M)

Where 'AD' is aggregate demand, 'C' is consumption, 'I' is investment, 'G' is government expenditures, 'X' is exports, and 'M' is imports.

This means that any one of these components can change and affect the aggregate demand, and large individual increases in these specific components can have the short run effect of raising the overall price of goods. This is known as Demand-pull inflation since the change to overall prices were triggered, or "pulled," by the changes in the aggregate demand. Short run increases in demand can cause output to increase, putting upward pressure on prices. In the long run, this can cause demand to decrease; or, if demand remains at a higher quantity of output, then the aggregate supply curve will also shift to a higher level of output and reach equilibrium at a higher quantity. Growth in long-run aggregate supply can be caused by increases in productive capacity through new infrastructure, new factories, increases in the working population, and labor productivity via technology, education, training or efficiency gains.

An economist from New Zealand, A. W. Phillips (Alban William Houego), contributed to modern macroeconomics with the Phillips Curve. His model shows a trade-off between unemployment and inflation rates, and this relationship can often be observed in real-world historical data. The underlying principle is as follows: as the unemployment rate drops, aggregate demand in the economy increases, and that, in turn, has a short run impact that drives prices up because supply levels have not been increased in the same manner.

=== Income distribution ===
Significant attention has been awarded to the issues of income distribution and wealth inequality recently in the U.S. news and media, a response to evidence that growth in income in the country over the past few decades has been distributed primarily in favor of the top 1% of the population, while the lower 99% have experience much slower relative income growth. Often referred to as a key factor in the advent that is the alleged "shrinking middle class," changes in income distribution have been said to weaken demand due to the resulting imbalances between various income groups’ marginal propensities to consume. Socioeconomic groups with a high marginal propensity to consume tend to affect growth more significantly than those without a high marginal propensity to consume by creating a strong and stable source of demand. Additionally, a strong middle class contributes to demand-led growth by supporting education, providing human capital, enabling entrepreneurship, and acting as the foundation for inclusive political and economic institutions. Various entities and groups play a role in the general response to an increase in aggregate demand, and there is an obvious diversity among the winners and losers when such economic changes take place.
