= Kamala and Maya's Big Idea =

2020 picture book written by Meena Harris and illustrated by Ana Ramírez González

- Author: Meena Harris
- Illustrator: Ana Ramírez González
- Language: English
- Genre: Children's picture book
- Publisher: Balzer + Bray
- Publication date: 2020
- Publication place: United States
- Pages: 32
- ISBN: 978-0-0630-1891-4
- OCLC: 1156472500
- Followed by: Ambitious Girl

Kamala and Maya's Big Idea is a children's picture book written by Meena Harris and illustrated by Ana Ramírez González. The book was published in 2020 by Balzer + Bray and it was Harris's debut book as a children's author. The story is based on the childhood of Kamala and Maya Harris, the author's aunt and mother, respectively.

== Plot ==
Kamala and Maya Harris live in an apartment building that has no place for them to play. The two girls decide one day to turn the empty courtyard into a playground. Because the adults do not want to help, and they lack money to buy materials, the sisters begin a campaign to recruit other kids in the building to help them.

By hanging posters around and doing a garage sale, they manage to convince some of the adults to donate items for the playground, as well as acquire funds to buy any necessary material to build it up.

== Background ==
Kamala and Maya's Big Idea's story is based on the lives of Harris's mother and aunt. In an interview with Business Insider, Harris said one of the reasons she decided to write the book and work as a children's author was so she could tell stories that were inspirational to her as she grew up. This included "these lessons around things like community organizing, around coalition building, around leaning on your community".

== Reception ==
The New York Times highlighted the book in a list called "8 Picture Books About Ordinary Kids' Everyday Activism". Writing for SheKnows.com, Sabrina Weiss called it an "inspiring tale all on its own," and also noted how González' illustrations "are engaging for young readers." The parenting website, Moms.com, mentioned some of the praise the book received from people such as Elizabeth Warren and Stacey Abrams, who called it "[a] must read for little girls around the world" and "[a]n inspiring tale", respectively.

The book debuted #5 on the New York Times bestseller list.
