= Gloria Escoffery =

Jamaican painter (1923–2002)

Gloria Escoffery O.D.
- Born: 22 December 1923; Gayle, St. Mary, Colony of Jamaica
- Died: 24 April 2002 (aged 78); Brown's Town, St. Ann, Jamaica
- Education: McGill University, Slade School of Fine Arts, University of the West Indies's School of Education
- Occupations: Artist, poet, teacher, art critic and journalist
- Notable work: Rootsman Adam Reincarnates For The Millennium (2000); Banana Plantation Workers (1953); The Old Woman (1955)
- Children: Fabian
- Awards: Officer of the Order of Distinction, Silver Musgrave Institute of Jamaica, Member of Caribbean Hall of Fame

Gloria Escoffery OD (22 December 1923 – 24 April 2002) was a Jamaican painter, poet and art critic that contributed to post-colonial arts and culture during the mid-to-late 20th century.

== Biography ==
Born in Gayle, Saint Mary Parish, Jamaica, the youngest of three children of Dr. William T. Escoffery, medical officer, and his wife Sylvia, Escoffery attended St Hilda's High School, Brown's Town. In 1942 she won the Island Scholarship and went to McGill University in Montreal, Quebec, Canada, and subsequently studied in England at the Slade School of Fine Arts (1950–52), and the University of the West Indies's School of Education.

Having held her first solo exhibition in Kingston in 1944, Escoffery exhibited extensively in Jamaica and elsewhere. Her works feature in many public and private collections.

In 1977 she was awarded the Order of Distinction and the Silver Musgrave Medal from the Institute of Jamaica in 1985.

== Publications ==
- Landscape in the Making (a pamphlet, 1976)
- Loggerhead (Sandberry Press, 1988)
- Mother Jackson Murders the Moon (Peepal Tree Press, 1998)

Escoffery contributed regularly to the academic journal Caribbean Quarterly, which is associated with the University of the West Indies located in Kingston, Jamaica. Some of these published works in the journal are:

- House and Home (Taylor & Francis Group, 2003)
- The Bicycle Lamp: An Artist's Reflections on Art Teaching (Taylor & Francis Group, 1968)

== Paintings ==
The most visible archive of Escoffery's artworks belong to the National Gallery of Jamaica, and can be viewed on the gallery website, along with an artist biography. Similar to her literature, Escoffery's paintings display various interpretations of Jamaican modernism experienced throughout her lifetime.
