= Nodeep Kaur =

Indian activist

- Born: February 11, 1996 (age 30)
- Citizenship: Indian
- Known for: India’s Farm Protests

Nodeep Kaur (born 11 February 1996) is an Indian Dalit labour rights activist and member of the Mazdoor Adhikar Sangathan (MAS), one of the unions of industrial workers actively supporting the 2020–2021 Indian farmers' protest. Kaur was arrested from the Kundli Industrial Area by the Haryana Police on 12 January 2021 and had FIRs filed against her on a wide range of sections including unlawful assembly, assault and criminal force, trespass, extortion, snatching, criminal intimidation, and attempt to murder, based on statements made by a police inspector and the accountant of the company that had failed to pay protesting workers’ wages. She was allegedly beaten and sexually assaulted while in police custody. According to Kaur's lawyer, a medical report ordered after Kaur's arrest revealed wounds that pointed to a sexual assault.

The Sonipat Court, Haryana denied bail to Kaur on 2 February 2021 in one of three FIR's on the grounds that the allegations are serious in nature, but got bail in other two FIR's after that. Kaur's sister Rajvir (also spelled Rajveer) Kaur has stated that the family intends to move the Punjab and Haryana High Court, and that the story has received little mainstream media attention due to the family's caste and economic background. Additionally, Rajveer Kaur has stated that Nodeep Kaur and many others were targeted because of their vision for equality, and a society free from oppression and exploitation.

Indo-Canadian poet Rupi Kaur brought international attention to Kaur by tweeting in her support and demanding her release. Meena Harris also tweeted about and brought global attention to Kaur.

== Early life ==
Kaur was born to a poor Dalit family in Punjab. She was brought upon in a family set up that have always stood against oppression and exploitation. Her mother had been a member of kissan union. She had protested against rape of a landless dalit women by upper caste landlord in her village. Due to which her family faced social boycott and had to move to Telangana. Because of this Nodeep's studies were discontinued. She had to do her 12th from an open college. After completing her 12th, she came to Delhi in 2019 as she wanted to join undergraduate course in delhi university. In Delhi she became a member of Bhagat Singh Chatra Ekta Manch. Bhagat Singh Chatra Ekta Manch (BSCEM) is a pro-left organisation in Delhi University. As a member of this student organisation she was active in the anti CAA protest. Later on due to financial crunches in her family, she joined a company in Kundli Industrial area of Sonipat district in Haryana. She was disturbed by the sight of constant humiliation of labourers at the hand of factory owners. She started demanding the implementation of minimum wage act, equal pay for equal work for women labour, payment for over time jobs, etc. To successfully campaign for these demands she joined Majdoor Adhikhar Sangathan (MAS).
