= Fugitives, Smugglers, and Thieves =

2018 book by Sharada Balachandran Orihuela

Fugitives, Smugglers, and Thieves: Piracy and Personhood in American Literature
- Author: Sharada Balachandran Orihuela
- Language: English
- Genre: Non-fiction
- Publisher: University of North Carolina Press
- Publication date: 2018
- Pages: 248
- ISBN: 978-1-4696-4092-1

Fugitives, Smugglers, and Thieves: Piracy and Personhood in American Literature is the debut book by Mexican academic Sharada Balachandran Orihuela. It was published by University of North Carolina Press in 2018. It explores piracy and illegal trade in American literature as a form of self-representation by colonial subjects facing abjection due to exclusionary citizenship and property laws.

Orihuela, an Indian Mexican, was born in Mexico to Rosamaria Orihuela and Gopalan Balachandran. She is the granddaughter of civil servant P. V. Gopalan, the cousin of lawyer Maya Harris and U.S. Vice President Kamala Harris, and the niece of biomedical scientist Shyamala Gopalan, who influenced her intellectual trajectory in the aftermath of the September 11 attacks.

In the book, Balachandran Orihuela explores piracy and illegal trade in American literature. The exclusionary concepts of citizenship resulting in the social, political, and economic isolation of pirates impacts their "racial, national, and gendered identities." She uses the Two Treatises of Government and Commentaries on the Laws of England as the bases of property ownership. In her book, property is part of a "matrix of rights and claims for citizenship." Balachandran Orihuela posits that certain minorities, slaves, and other colonial subjects disenfranchised by citizenship and property laws turned to piracy and illegal trade as a form of self-representation to combat abjection. Balachandran Orihuela investigated pirates, black slaves in the Antebellum South, Mexicans on the Mexico–United States border before the Mexican–American War, and Confederate blockade runners of the American Civil War.

The book received positive literary reviews in Early American Literature and the Journal of American Studies.
