= Afro-American Association =

American organization in the 1960s

The Afro-American Association (AAA) was an influential organization that started in 1962 in Berkeley, California and Oakland, California. It began as a study group teaching African and African American history, later hosting speakers, meetings, forums, and other activities. Historian Donna Murch has described it as “the most foundational institution in the Black Power movement.”

== Organization ==
In 1962, a group of graduate and law students at University of California, Berkeley, started a reading group with the goal of educating themselves and their community about African and African American history. The founding members were Donald Warden, Donald Hopkins, Otho Green, and Henry Ramsey.

Susan D. Anderson, a curator at the California African American Museum, said "They read the black writers that the university was ignoring…(and) devoured Ralph Ellison, discussed Carter G. Woodson, debated W.E.B. DuBois. They talked about apartheid, about African decolonization, about liberation movements in the developing world, and about the history of racism in America."

There were also chapters in other cities and universities. The Los Angeles chapter was chaired by Maulana Karenga. Donald Warden visited Portland, Oregon, in 1963 and returned in February 1964, proposing to form a chapter of the Afro-American Association in that city. In the mid-1960s, students formed a chapter of the Afro-American Association at Duke University in North Carolina. At Northeastern University in Massachusetts in 1966, students dissatisfied with Student Nonviolence Coordinating Committee formed an AAA chapter to advocate for African American students and political awareness on campus. Students at the University of Alabama established an Afro-American Association in 1968, which later became their Black Student Union.

== Impact ==
Donald Warden mentored Huey P. Newton and Bobby Seale, who were Afro-American Association members and co-founded the Black Panther Party in 1966. Another AAA member, Kenny Freeman, contributed to the party's Ten-Point Program.

The parents of Kamala Harris, Donald J. Harris and Shyamala Gopalan, were part of the study group that became the Afro-American Association.

Several members became prominent cultural and political leaders. These included Ron Dellums (congressman and Oakland mayor), Judge Thelton Henderson, and Cedric Robinson (professor and scholar of Black Studies). Henry Ramsey became an Alameda County Superior Court judge, member of the Berkeley City Council, and dean of the Howard University School of Law.
