= P. V. Gopalan =

Indian civil servant (1911–1998)

- P. V. Gopalan with his granddaughter, Kamala Harris, c. 1960s.

Personal details
- Born: Painganadu Venkataraman Gopalan; 1911 Thulasendrapuram, Madras Presidency, British India
- Died: February 1998 (aged 86–87) Chennai, Tamil Nadu, India
- Spouse: Balachandran Rajam
- Children: 4, including Shyamala
- Relatives: Kamala Harris (granddaughter); Maya Harris (granddaughter); Meena Harris (great-granddaughter)
- Known for: Maternal grandfather of Kamala Harris

Painganadu Venkataraman Gopalan (1911 – February 1998) was an Indian career civil servant who served with the Zambian and the Indian governments.

As director of relief measures and refugees in Zambia, he oversaw the exodus of refugees from Southern Rhodesia (now Zimbabwe) during the Rhodesian Bush War. He later served as advisor to the first President of Zambia Kenneth Kaunda and also as Joint Secretary to the Government of India in 1960s.

Gopalan was a member of the Imperial Secretariat Service and later a Central Secretariat Service officer. He was the maternal grandfather of the 49th vice president of the United States, Kamala Harris.

== Early life ==
Gopalan was born in 1911 into a conservative Iyengar family, at Painganadu Agraharam, Thulasendrapuram in the Madras Presidency, British India.

== Career ==
Gopalan joined the Imperial Secretariat Service during British rule in India which later merged into the Central Secretariat Service. He served as under secretary to the government of India in the Ministry of Transport (Roads Wing). In the 1950s, he was posted as a senior commercial officer in Mumbai. He worked on the rehabilitation of refugees from East Pakistan in India. Rising through the ranks, Gopalan was later empanelled and served as Joint Secretary to the Government of India in the Ministry of Labour, Employment and Rehabilitation.

With effect from 28 January 1966, he was deputed to the government of Zambia and lived in Lusaka as Director of Relief Measures and Refugees in 1966 during the Zimbabwean War of Independence, to help Zambia manage an influx of refugees from Southern Rhodesia (now Zimbabwe). While in Lusaka in the 1960s, as recorded in a public lands document dated March 9, 1967, Gopalan and his family resided at 16 Independence Avenue. He was appointed to the selection grade of the Central Secretariat Service from 1 May 1966, and ended his posting in Zambia with effect from 24 July 1969, reverting to his former role in the Department of Rehabilitation. He retired from government service with effect from 2 October 1969.

== Personal life ==
P. V. Gopalan was married to Gopalan Rajam (née Balachandran), who was betrothed to him at age twelve and began living with him at sixteen. Rajam never attended high school.

They lived in Karol Bagh at Central Delhi district and also at other areas in New Delhi. The couple had four children: the oldest, a daughter, Shyamala, who earned a PhD in endocrinology at the University of California, Berkeley, and went on to have an academic and research career in the US and Canada; a son, Balachandran, who received a PhD in economics and computer science from the University of Wisconsin–Madison and returned to an academic career in India; a daughter, Sarala, an obstetrician who practised in Chennai; and the youngest, another daughter, Mahalakshmi, an information scientist, who worked for the Government of Ontario, Canada. Gopalan was the grandfather of lawyer Maya Harris, former Vice President Kamala Harris, and academic Sharada Balachandran Orihuela. Shyamala and her daughters used to visit Gopalan once every two to three years to visit her family and went for walks on Edward Elliot's Beach in Besant Nagar.

Kamala Harris has said that she was strongly influenced by his progressive political views on democracy and women's rights, especially their right to education. He later bought an apartment in Besant Nagar and lived in Chennai until his death.

Order of precedence
Unknown	Order of Precedence of India as Joint Secretary to Government of India; 1960's	Unknown
