= Donald J. Harris =

Jamaican-American economist (born 1938)

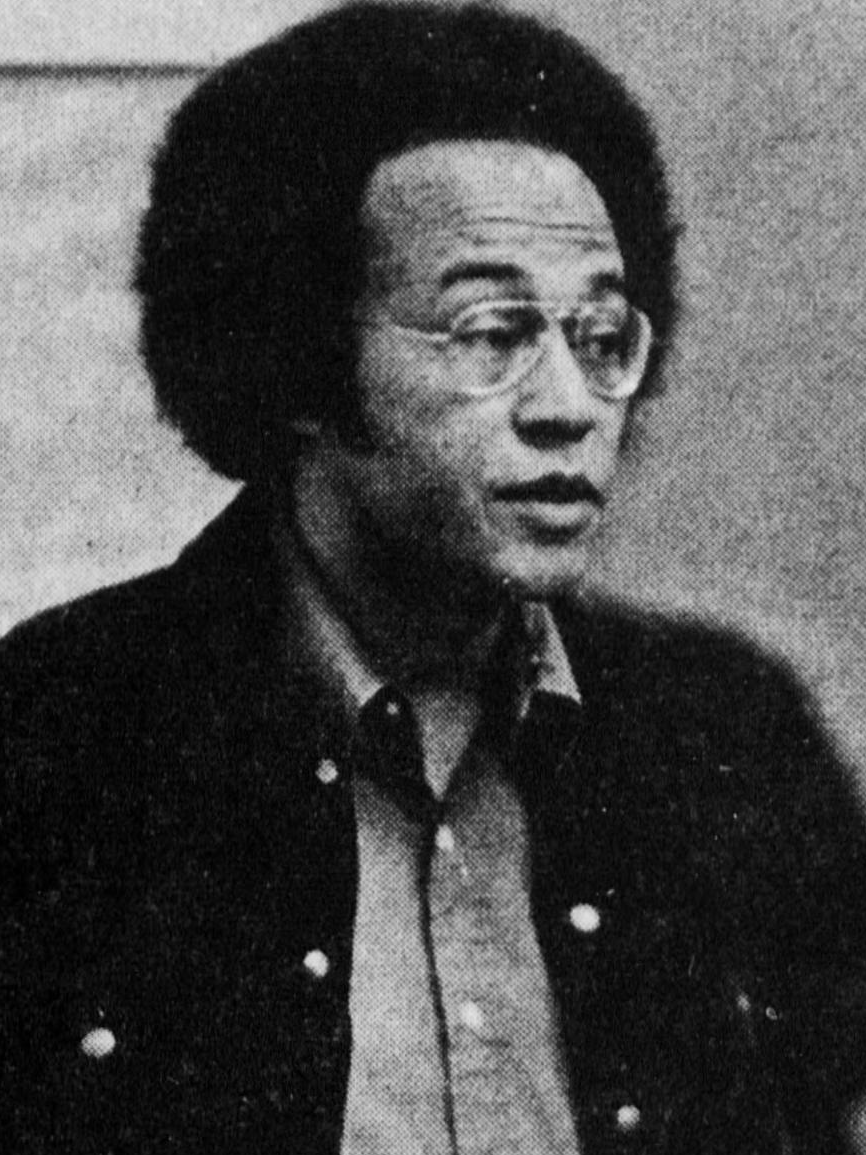
- Harris in 1974
- Born: Donald Jasper Harris; August 23, 1938 (age 88); Brown's Town, Colony of Jamaica, British Empire
- Citizenship: Jamaica; United States
- Spouse(s): Shyamala Gopalan (m. 1963; div. 1971) Carol Kirlew
- Children: Kamala; Maya
- Relatives: Harris family

Academic background
- Education: University College of the West Indies (BA); University of California, Berkeley (PhD)
- Thesis: Inflation, Capital Accumulation and Economic Growth : A Theoretical and Numerical Analysis (1966)
- Doctoral advisor: Daniel McFadden

Academic work
- Discipline: Economics
- Sub-discipline: Post-Keynesian development economics
- Institutions: University of Illinois; Northwestern University; University of Wisconsin; Stanford University
- Doctoral students: Robert A. Blecker; Warren Whatley
- Website: Stanford Department of Economics page

Donald Jasper Harris (born August 23, 1938) is a Jamaican-American economist and emeritus professor at Stanford University, known for applying post-Keynesian ideas to development economics. He was a scholar granted tenure in the Stanford Department of Economics, and he is the father of Kamala Harris, the 49th vice president of the United States and 2024 Democratic presidential nominee, and of Maya Harris, a lawyer, advocate and writer.

Harris was raised in Saint Ann Parish, Jamaica, earning a bachelor's degree from the University College of the West Indies and a PhD from the University of California, Berkeley. He held professorships at the University of Illinois at Urbana-Champaign, Northwestern University, and University of Wisconsin-Madison before joining Stanford University as professor of economics.

Harris's 1978 book Capital Accumulation and Income Distribution critiques mainstream economic theories, using mathematical modeling to propose an alternative model for thinking about the effects of capital accumulation on income inequality, economic growth, instability, and other phenomena. He has worked extensively on analysis and policy regarding the economy of Jamaica. He served in Jamaica, at various times, as economic policy consultant to the government and as economic adviser to successive prime ministers. In 2021, he was awarded Jamaica's Order of Merit, the country's third-highest national honor, for his "contribution to national development".

== Early life ==
Donald Jasper Harris was born in Brown's Town, St. Ann Parish, Jamaica, the son of Oscar Joseph Harris and Beryl Finegan, who were Afro-Jamaicans. As a child, Harris learned the catechism, was baptized and confirmed in the Anglican Church, and served as an acolyte.

Harris's paternal grandmother, born Christiana Brown, told Harris that she was descended from Irish-born plantation owner Hamilton Brown (1776–1843), who founded the local Anglican Church where her final resting place is.

Harris grew up in the Orange Hill area of Saint Ann Parish, near Brown's Town and graduated from Titchfield High School in Port Antonio. He earned a Bachelor of Arts degree from the University College of the West Indies (then part of the University of London) in 1960, and a PhD from the University of California, Berkeley in 1966. His doctoral dissertation, Inflation, Capital Accumulation and Economic Growth: A Theoretical and Numerical Analysis, was supervised by econometrician Daniel McFadden.

== Career ==
Harris was an assistant professor at the University of Illinois at Urbana–Champaign from 1966 to 1967 and at Northwestern University from 1967 to 1968. He moved to the University of Wisconsin–Madison as an associate professor in 1968. In 1972, he joined the faculty of Stanford University as a professor of economics, and became the first black scholar to be granted tenure in Stanford's Department of Economics. At various times, he was a visiting fellow in Cambridge University and Delhi School of Economics; and visiting professor at Yale University. He served on the editorial boards of the Journal of Economic Literature and the journal Social and Economic Studies. He is a longtime member of the American Economic Association.

Harris directed the Consortium Graduate School of Social Sciences at the University of the West Indies in 1986–1987, and he was a Fulbright Scholar at the University of Brasília in 1990 and 1991, and in Mexico in 1992. In 1998, he retired from Stanford, becoming a professor emeritus.

At Stanford, Harris's doctoral students have included Steven Fazzari, a professor of economics at Washington University in St. Louis, and Robert A. Blecker, a professor of economics at American University in Washington, D.C. Harris helped to develop the new program in Alternative Approaches to Economic Analysis as a field of graduate study. For many years, he also taught the undergraduate course Theory of Capitalist Development. He took early retirement from Stanford in 1998 in order to pursue his interest in developing public policies to promote economic growth and advance social equity.

=== Contributions to economic analysis and policy ===
Harris's economic philosophy was critical of mainstream economics and questioned orthodox assumptions. The New York Times described him as "a prominent critic of mainstream economic theory from the left".

Harris's research and publications have focused on exploring the process of capital accumulation and its implications for economic growth, arguing that economic inequality and uneven development are inevitable properties of economic growth in a market economy.

Harris is said to work in the tradition of Post-Keynesian economics. He has acknowledged the works of Joan Robinson, Maurice Dobb, Piero Sraffa, Michal Kalecki, Karl Marx, John Maynard Keynes, Joseph Schumpeter, and W. Arthur Lewis as influences upon his work.

One of Harris's most notable contributions to economics is his 1978 monograph Capital Accumulation and Income Distribution, which is a critique of orthodox economic theories that provides an alternative, synthesizing the work of David Ricardo, Kalecki, Marx, Roy Harrod, and others. Harris employs mathematical modeling to explore the relationship between the accumulation of capital and income inequality, economic growth, economic instability, and other phenomena, arguing that typical theories fail to adequately consider power, class, and historical context.

Harris has done research on the economy of Jamaica, presenting analyses and reports on the structural conditions, historical performance, and contemporary problems of the economy, as well as developing plans and policies for promoting economic growth and social inclusion. Notable outcomes of this effort are the National Industrial Policy promulgated by the Government of Jamaica in 1996 and the Growth Inducement Strategy of 2011.

He has published several books on the economy of Jamaica, including Jamaica's Export Economy: Towards a Strategy of Export-led Growth (Ian Randle Publishers, 1997) and A Growth-Inducement Strategy for Jamaica in the Short and Medium Term (edited with G. Hutchinson, Planning Institute of Jamaica, 2012). Jamaica has in recent years been considered an economic success story, as it has achieved sustained economic growth and large reductions in public debt, and some allies attribute this success to an agreement between Jamaica and the International Monetary Fund that was made possible through Harris's growth strategy for Jamaica.

== Personal life ==
Harris arrived at the University of California, Berkeley on the Issa Scholarship (founded and funded by Kingston merchant Elias A. Issa in the 1930s) in the fall of 1961. Later in the fall of 1962, he spoke at a meeting of the Afro-American Association, a students' group at Berkeley. After his talk, he met Shyamala Gopalan (1938–2009), a graduate student in nutrition and endocrinology from India at UC Berkeley who was in the audience. According to Harris, "We talked then, continued to talk at a subsequent meeting, and at another, and another." In July 1963, he married Shyamala.

Harris and Shyamala had two children: Kamala Harris, the 49th vice president of the United States; and Maya Harris, a lawyer and political commentator. The couple divorced in 1971. The children visited Harris's family in Jamaica as they grew up. Harris dedicated his 1978 book to his daughters. He has led a largely private life amid his children's rise to prominence, declining nearly all interview requests. Over the years, Kamala Harris has described her relationship with her father as cordial but distant, owing to her being primarily raised by her mother.

At some time prior to May 2015, Harris became a naturalized U.S. citizen, and reportedly has a residence in Washington, D.C. In the 1990s Harris remarried, to Carol Kirlew, a Jamaican American who worked in communications for the World Bank.

== Select bibliography ==
=== Books ===
- Capital Accumulation and Income Distribution, Stanford University Press, 1978. ISBN 0-8047-0947-5.
- Jamaica's Export Economy: Towards a Strategy of Export-led Growth, Kingston: Ian Randle Publishers, 1997. ISBN 976-8123-43-5.
- A Growth-Inducement Strategy for Jamaica in the Short and Medium Term (edited with G. Hutchinson), Kingston, The Planning Institute of Jamaica, 2012. ISBN 978-976-8103-39-0.

=== Articles ===
- Harris, Donald J. (1973). "Capital, Distribution, and the Aggregate Production Function". The American Economic Review. 63 (1): 100–113. JSTOR 1803129.
- Harris, Donald J. (1972). "On Marx's Scheme of Reproduction and Accumulation". Journal of Political Economy. 80 (3): 505–522. doi:10.1086/259902. JSTOR 1830564.
- Harris, Donald J. (1978). "Capitalist Exploitation and Black Labor: Some Conceptual Issues". The Review of Black Political Economy. 8 (2): 133–151. doi:10.1007/BF02689492.
- Harris, Donald J. (1993). "Economic Growth and Equity: Complements or Opposites?". The Review of Black Political Economy. 21 (3): 65–72. doi:10.1007/bf02701705.
