= Paul A. David =

American economist (1935–2023)

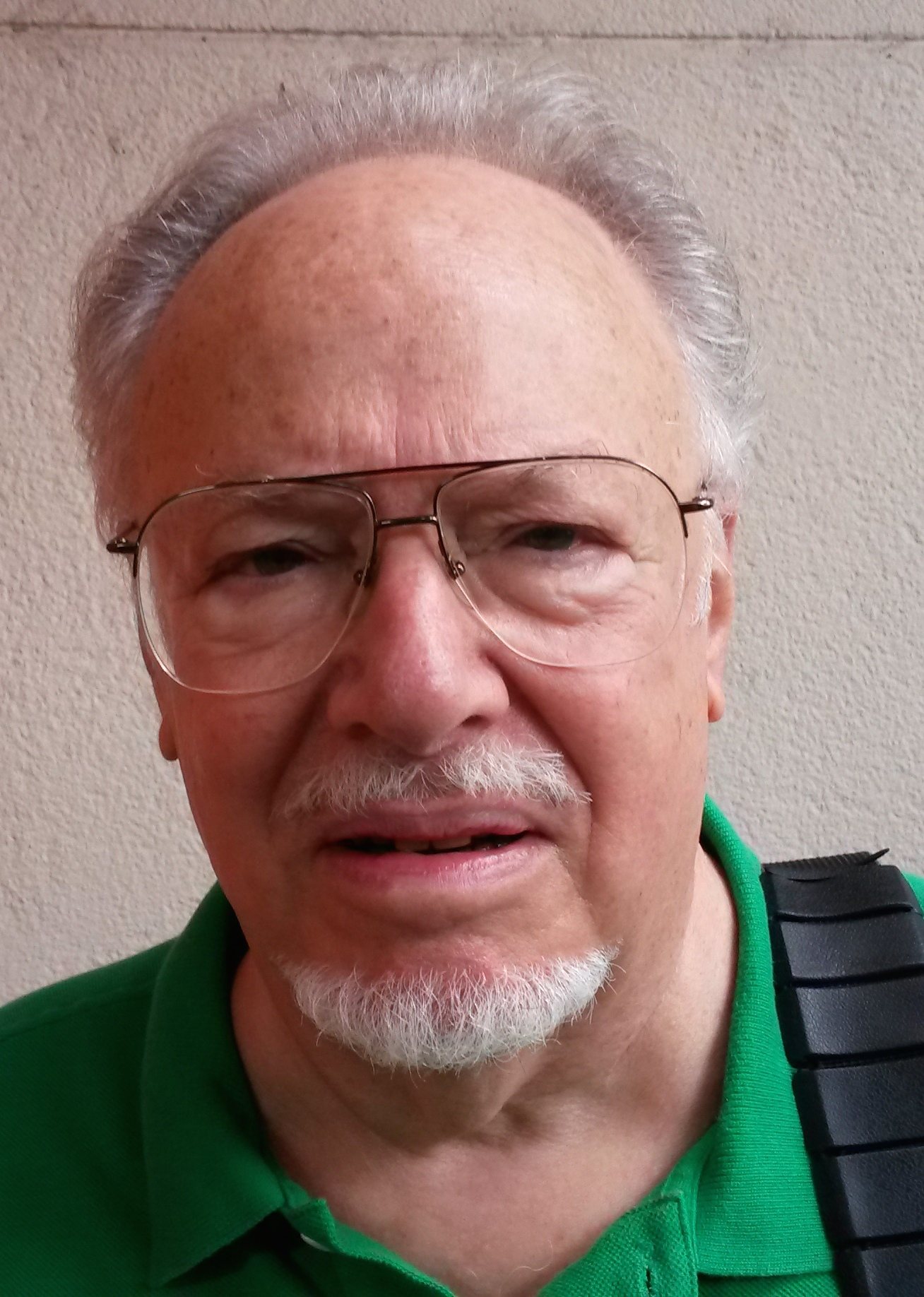
- David in 2014
- Born: Paul Allan David; May 24, 1935; New York City, New York, U.S.
- Died: January 23, 2023 (aged 87); Palo Alto, California, U.S.
- Occupation: Economics professor
- Years active: 1961–2022
- Known for: Path dependence
- Title: Professor of Economics (Emeritus) & Senior Fellow of SIEPR, Stanford University

Academic background
- Education: Harvard University (AB, PhD); University of Cambridge

Academic work
- Discipline: Economics
- Institutions: Harvard University (1958–1960); Stanford University (1961–2022); University of Oxford (1993–2022); UNU-MERIT (1993–2022)
- Doctoral students: Warren Whatley; Leonard Carlson; Charles W. Calomiris; Ashish Arora

Paul Allan David (May 24, 1935 – January 23, 2023) was an American academic economist, noted for his work on the economics of scientific progress and technical change. He was also well known for his work in American economic history and in demographic economics.

== Early life and education ==
David was born into a Jewish family in New York on May 24, 1935. His father was a history professor at Columbia University. He enrolled at Harvard University specializing in chemistry. However, he switched to studying economics under economist Alexander Gerschenkron. He graduated from Harvard in 1956.

He attended the University of Cambridge for two years, before returning to Harvard. He started a dissertation on the economic history of Chicago. However, he did not turn it in. He received a Ph.D. from Harvard in 1973.

== Career ==
David began his academic career at Stanford University in 1961. There he focused on studying economic change and innovation.

David was a president of the Economic History Association, a fellow of the Econometric Society, a fellow of the American Academy of Arts and Sciences, a fellow of the British Academy, a fellow of the Oxford Internet Institute and All Souls College, Oxford, a member of the American Philosophical Society, a professor emeritus and senior fellow of Stanford University's Institute for Economic Policy Research, and professorial fellow at the UNU-MERIT.

=== Notable works ===
David's work focused on the history of technological change and its economic impact. He wrote several papers and books on this topic, including "Clio and the Economics of QWERTY" (1985), "The Dynamo and the Computer: An Historical Perspective on the Modern Productivity Paradox" (1990), and Path Dependence, Its Critics and the Quest for Historical Economics (1997). He also made important contributions to our understanding of the economics of intellectual property, the history of telecommunications, and the economics of innovation. His studies also covered disparate topics including nuclear power plants, migration, slavery, birth control, and government interventions in the economy.

In 2006, Edward Elgar published a festschrift called New Frontiers in the Economics of Innovation and New Technology: Essays in Honour of Paul A. David.

== Personal life and death ==
David was married to Sheila Ryan Johansson-David, a historian. The couple had two children. An earlier marriage to Janet M. Williamson in 1958 had ended in a divorce. He had two children from this earlier marriage.

David died on January 23, 2023, at age 87.

== Academic honors ==
- Fellow of the International Econometrics Society (1975)
- Pitt Professor of American History and Institutions at the University of Cambridge
- Fellow of the American Academy of Arts and Sciences (1979)
- Vice-president and president of the Economic History Association (1988–1989)
- Marshall Lecturer at the University of Cambridge
- President of the Economic History Association

== Publications ==
- Reinterpreting Economic Growth: Parables and Realities, with Moses Abramovitz, American Economic Review, 1973
- "Clio and the Economics of QWERTY", American Economic Review, 1985
- Technical Choice, Innovation and Economic Growth (1975)
- The Economic Future in Historical Perspective (2003)

== See also ==
- QWERTY—About which David wrote
