= Shyamala Gopalan Educational Foundation =

Non-Profit Organisation based in India

- Founded: December 2018
- Founder: Nalla Suresh Reddy
- Type: Nonprofit organisation
- Purpose: Education
- Location: Telangana, India
- Region served: India
- Website: shyamalagopalanfoundation.org

Shyamala Gopalan Educational Foundation is an India-based non-profit organization focused on education, cultural preservation, women's empowerment, and social equality. The foundation is named after Shyamala Gopalan, an Indian-born biomedical scientist and women's rights activist. Nalla Suresh Reddy established it and operates primarily in Telangana, India.

== History ==
Shyamala Gopalan Foundation was founded in 2018 by Nalla Suresh Reddy, a philanthropist and Industrialist from Telangana, with the stated aim of promoting educational access, restoring cultural heritage, and empowering marginalized communities. Reddy has described his inspiration as stemming from Dr. Shyamala Gopalan's life and work in science and social advocacy.

== Mission ==
Shyamala Gopalan Educational Foundation honors the legacy of Shyamala Gopalan, a visionary Indian-origin scientist and mentor. The Foundation is set up with a mission to transform India's educational landscape by delivering international-standard education to a broad segment of the population, ensuring excellence is accessible to all. Beyond education, the Foundation is involved in health, environmental sustainability, and social service initiatives, with a strong focus on empowering underserved communities and nurturing young minds to thrive in a rapidly changing world.

== Work ==
Shyamala Gopalan Educational Foundation (SGEF) is an Indian non-profit organization engaged in education, healthcare, environmental conservation, and community development. Its Tribal Health Care programme works to eliminate avoidable blindness in Bhadradri Kothagudem district of Telangana, providing cataract surgeries and conducting free medical and blood donation camps. The Tree for Life initiative promotes afforestation, with thousands of saplings planted towards a one-million-tree target. Community welfare projects include distributing food grains, ration kits, and implementing an Insurance for All scheme offering life cover to families of small transport operators.
