= Robert A. Blecker =

American economist and professor

Robert A. Blecker was an American economist and professor in the Department of Economics at American University in Washington, DC. and Affiliate Faculty of the American University School of International Service and Center for Latin American and Latino Studies, and a research associate at the Economic Policy Institute and Political Economy Research Institute. His research has made contributions to the fields of post-Keynesian and neo-Kaleckian macroeconomics, open economy macroeconomics, international trade theory and policy, global imbalances and the U.S. trade deficit, the North American Free Trade Agreement, the economy of Mexico, export-led growth, and the theory of balance-of-payments constrained growth (also known as Thirlwall's Law).

== Career ==
=== Education ===
Blecker was born in Philadelphia, PA, USA, on November 17, 1956. He attended Central High School of Philadelphia and graduated from Springfield Township High School, Montgomery County, PA in 1974. Blecker received a B.A. in economics from Yale University in 1978, and his M.A. and Ph.D. in economics from Stanford University in 1983 and 1987. He also took courses in the Master's program in economics at El Colegio de México in 1978-79 under a Fulbright scholarship.

American University awarded Blecker its Faculty Awards for Outstanding Teaching in 2005 and for Outstanding Service to the University Community in 2014.

=== Professional Activity ===
Blecker was a member of the editorial boards of the International Review of Applied Economics, Review of Keynesian Economics, European Journal of Economics and Economic Policies: Intervention, Investigación Económica (published by the UNAM Faculty of Economics in Mexico City), and Metroeconomica.

Blecker is perhaps best known for his work on the theory of demand-led growth in open economies, starting with his article in the Cambridge Journal of Economics in 1989. This article showed the possibility of both wage-led and profit-led demand regimes based on a country's exposure to international competition, parallel to a similar analysis for closed economies published around the same time by Amit Bhaduri and Stephen Marglin.

== Partial Publications List ==
=== Books ===
- Fundamentals of U.S. Foreign Trade Policy: Economics, Politics, Laws, and Issues, 2nd edition (co-authored with Stephen D. Cohen and Peter D. Whitney). Boulder, CO: Westview, 2003.
- Taming Global Finance: A Better Architecture for Growth and Equity. Washington, DC: Economic Policy Institute, 1999.

=== Articles ===
- “Wage-led Versus Profit-led Demand Regimes: The Long and the Short of It,” Review of Keynesian Economics, vol. 4, no. 4 (2016), forthcoming.
- “The US economy Since the Crisis: Slow Recovery and Secular Stagnation,” European Journal of Economics and Economic Policies: Intervention, vol. 13, no. 2 (2016), pp. 203-14.
- “Structural Change, the Real Exchange Rate and the Balance of Payments in Mexico, 1960-2012” (co-authored with Carlos A. Ibarra), Cambridge Journal of Economics, vol. 40, no. 2 (March 2016), pp. 507-39.
- “Stolper-Samuelson Revisited: Trade and Distribution with Oligopolistic Profits,” Metroeconomica, vol. 63, no. 3 (July 2012), pp. 569-98.
- “External Shocks, Structural Change, and Economic Growth in Mexico, 1979-2007,” World Development, vol. 37, no. 7 (July 2009), pp. 1274-84.
- “The Fallacy of Composition and Contractionary Devaluations: Output Effects of Real Exchange Rate Shocks in Semi-Industrialised Countries” (co-authored with Arslan Razmi), Cambridge Journal of Economics, vol. 32, no. 1 (January 2008), pp. 83-109.
- “The Economic Consequences of Dollar Appreciation for U.S. Manufacturing Profits and Investment: A Time-Series Analysis,” International Review of Applied Economics, vol. 21, no. 4 (September 2007), pp. 491-517.
- “Macroeconomic Effects of Reducing Gender Wage Inequality in an Export-oriented, Semi-industrialized Economy” (co-authored with Stephanie Seguino), Review of Development Economics, vol. 6, no. 1 (February 2002), pp. 103-19.
- “The ‘Unnatural and Retrograde Order’: Adam Smith’s Theories of Trade and Development Reconsidered,” Economica, vol. 64 (August 1997), pp. 527-37.
- “The New Economic Integration: Structuralist Models of North-South Trade and Investment Liberalization,” Structural Change and Economic Dynamics, vol. 7, no. 3 (1996), pp. 321-45.
- “International Competition, Income Distribution, and Economic Growth,” Cambridge Journal of Economics, vol. 13, no. 3 (September 1989), pp. 395-412.

=== Book chapters ===
- “Integration, Productivity, and Inclusion in Mexico: A Macro Perspective,” in Alejandro Foxley and Barbara Stallings, eds., Innovation and Inclusion in Latin America: Strategies to Avoid the Middle Income Trap, New York: Palgrave Macmillan, 2016, pp. 177–204.
- “Long-Run Growth in Open Economies: Export-Led Cumulative Causation or a Balance-of-Payments Constraint?” in G. C. Harcourt and Peter Kriesler, eds., The Oxford Handbook of Post-Keynesian Economics, vol. I, Theory and Origins. Oxford: Oxford University Press, 2013, pp. 390–414.
- “Global Imbalances and the U.S. Trade Deficit,” in Barry Z. Cynamon, Steven M. Fazzari, and Mark Setterfield, eds., After the Great Recession: The Struggle for Economic Recovery and Growth. New York: Cambridge University Press, 2013, pp. 187–215.
- “Trade and the Development Gap” (co-authored with Gerardo Esquivel), in Andrew Selee and Peter Smith, eds., Mexico and the United States: The Politics of Partnership. Boulder, CO: Lynne Rienner, 2013, pp. 83–110.
- “Open Economy Models of Growth and Distribution,” in Eckhard Hein and Engelbert Stockhammer, eds., A Modern Guide to Keynesian Macroeconomics and Economic Policies. Cheltenham, UK: Edward Elgar, 2011, pp. 215–39.
- “Distribution, Demand, and Growth in Neo-Kaleckian Macro Models,” in Mark Setterfield, ed., The Economics of Demand-Led Growth: Challenging the Supply-Side Vision of the Long Run. Cheltenham, UK, and Northampton, MA: Edward Elgar, 2002, pp. 129–52.
- “Policy Implications of the International Saving-Investment Correlation,” in Robert Pollin, ed., The Macroeconomics of Finance, Saving, and Investment. Ann Arbor: University of Michigan Press, 1997, pp. 173–229.
