= Meena Harris =

American attorney and author (born 1984)

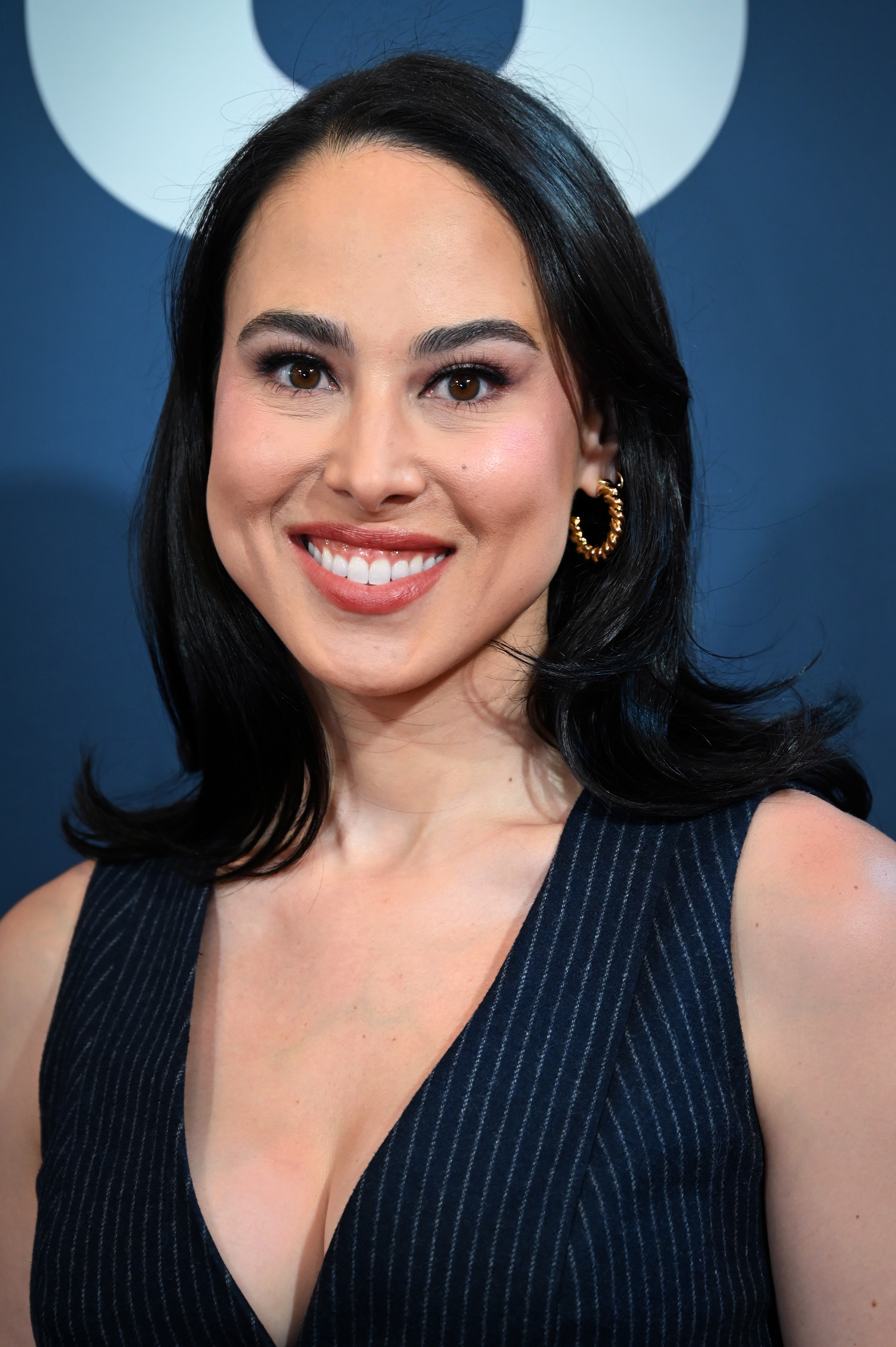
- Harris in 2026
- Born: Meenakshi Ashley Harris; October 20, 1984 (age 41); Oakland, California, U.S.
- Education: Stanford University (BA); Harvard University (JD)
- Political party: Democratic
- Spouse: Nikolas Ajagu (m. 2014)
- Children: 2
- Parents: Maya Harris (mother); Tony West (step-father)
- Relatives: Family of Kamala Harris

Meenakshi Ashley Harris (born October 20, 1984) is an American lawyer, author, and theater producer. In theatre production, Harris won a Tony Award for producing A Strange Loop and was also nominated for producing Suffs. Harris's first children's picture book, Kamala and Maya's Big Idea (2020), was released by HarperCollins' imprint Balzer + Bray; it was based on the story of her mother, Maya Harris, and aunt, Kamala Harris, former vice president of the United States.

In 2017, Harris founded the Phenomenal Woman Action Campaign, which creates statement fashion to support charity.

== Early life and education ==
Harris was born on October 20, 1984, to single parent Maya Lakshmi Harris, and the identity of her biological father remains publicly unknown. Her mother was 17 when she was born, and later became a lawyer and policy expert. Her aunt, Kamala Harris, was the 49th vice president of the United States. Her grandmother, Shyamala Gopalan, was an Indian-American cancer researcher and civil rights activist, and her grandfather, Donald Harris, is a Jamaican-American emeritus professor of economics at Stanford University and a civil rights activist.

Harris graduated from Bishop O'Dowd High School in Oakland. She earned her bachelor's degree from Stanford University in 2006, and her Juris Doctor from Harvard Law School in 2012.

== Career ==
=== Phenomenal ===
In 2017, she founded the "Phenomenal" fashion company, Harris being inspired by a 1978 Maya Angelou poem titled Phenomenal Woman. It then branched out to include the Phenomenal Woman Action Campaign, founded in 2017 as an organization that brings awareness to social causes. The campaign covers a range of policy issues, including educational excellence and healthcare equity, criminal justice reform, gender parity in STEM, reproductive health, and political representation. Ambassadors for the campaign include Serena Williams, Jessica Alba, Mark Ruffalo, Tracee Ellis Ross, Viola Davis, Yara Shahidi, Janelle Monae, Sarah Silverman, Debbie Allen, Rosario Dawson, Van Jones, Lizzo, Cecile Richards, and more. In September 2018, Harris also coordinated a full-page ad in The New York Times with Alicia Garza, founder of the Black Lives Matter Global Network, to demonstrate national support for Christine Blasey Ford and survivors of sexual assault. Harris also operates Phenomenal Media for written content and Phenomenal Productions for videos and visual content. In December 2020, it was announced that she and Brad Jenkins would launch a production studio called Phenomenal Productions.

=== Children's books ===
In 2020, Harris released her first children's picture book from HarperCollins' imprint Balzer + Bray titled Kamala and Maya's Big Idea, which is based on the real story of her mother, Maya Harris, and aunt Kamala Harris. On January 19, 2021, she released her second children's book, Ambitious Girl, and on March 14, 2023, her third children's book A Is for Ambitious was released, both printed by Little, Brown Books for Young Readers.

=== Political advising ===
During Kamala Harris's successful 2016 campaign for the U.S. Senate, Harris served as a senior advisor on policy and communications. From 2016 to 2017, Harris served as a commissioner on the San Francisco Commission on the Status of Women.

=== Other ===
Previously, Harris also served as Head of Strategy & Leadership at Uber where her stepfather Tony West is chief legal officer, and worked for international law firm Covington & Burling, software company Slack Technologies, and Facebook.

== Personal life ==
Harris married Nikolas Ajagu in 2014. He is the Global Head of Partnerships for Facebook’s Advertising Technology division. The couple has two daughters.

Harris is a Hindu.

== Bibliography ==
- Kamala and Maya's Big Idea. Balzer + Bray imprint of HarperCollins. 2020. ISBN 978-0062937407.
- Ambitious Girl. Little, Brown Books for Young Readers. 2021. ISBN 978-0316229692.
- A Is for Ambitious. Little, Brown Books for Young Readers. 2023. ISBN 978-0316354493.
