= Thulasendrapuram =

- Village
- Location in Tamil Nadu, India
- Coordinates: 10.5976093°N 79.4527823°E
- Country: India
- State: Tamil Nadu
- District: Tiruvarur

Languages
  - Official: Tamil
- Time zone: UTC+5:30 (IST)
- PIN: 614 020

Thulasendrapuram is a village in Tiruvarur district, Tamil Nadu, India. It is about 7 km from Mannargudi and 300 km from the state capital Chennai. In 2020, its population was approximately 350.

== Relationship to Kamala Harris ==
Thulasendrapuram was the home of P. V. Gopalan, an Indian career civil servant who was the maternal grandfather of Kamala Harris, the 49th vice president of the United States. In 2014, when Harris served as the attorney general of California, she donated ₹5,000 (US$52) to the village's temple dedicated to the deity Sastha, and her name was engraved on the temple's list of donors. Harris gained fame in the village when she was elected as vice president in 2020, and the people of Thulasendrapuram celebrated her victory with a communal feast, firecrackers, and prayers.

When Harris began her presidential campaign in the 2024 United States presidential election, residents installed a large banner depicting her outside of the village's main Hindu temple. Prior to the election, locals rallied and prayed to Aiyanar for her victory.

Harris has never visited Thulasendrapuram, and does not have any immediate family living there. Despite this, she is especially popular among the women of the village, who commonly refer to her as "sister" or "mother" as a sign of respect. Arulmozhi Sudhakar, a politician of Thulasendrapuram, described Harris as "a daughter of the land".

== See also ==
- Family of Kamala Harris
