= James Johnston (missionary) =

British missionary, photographer, doctor and explorer

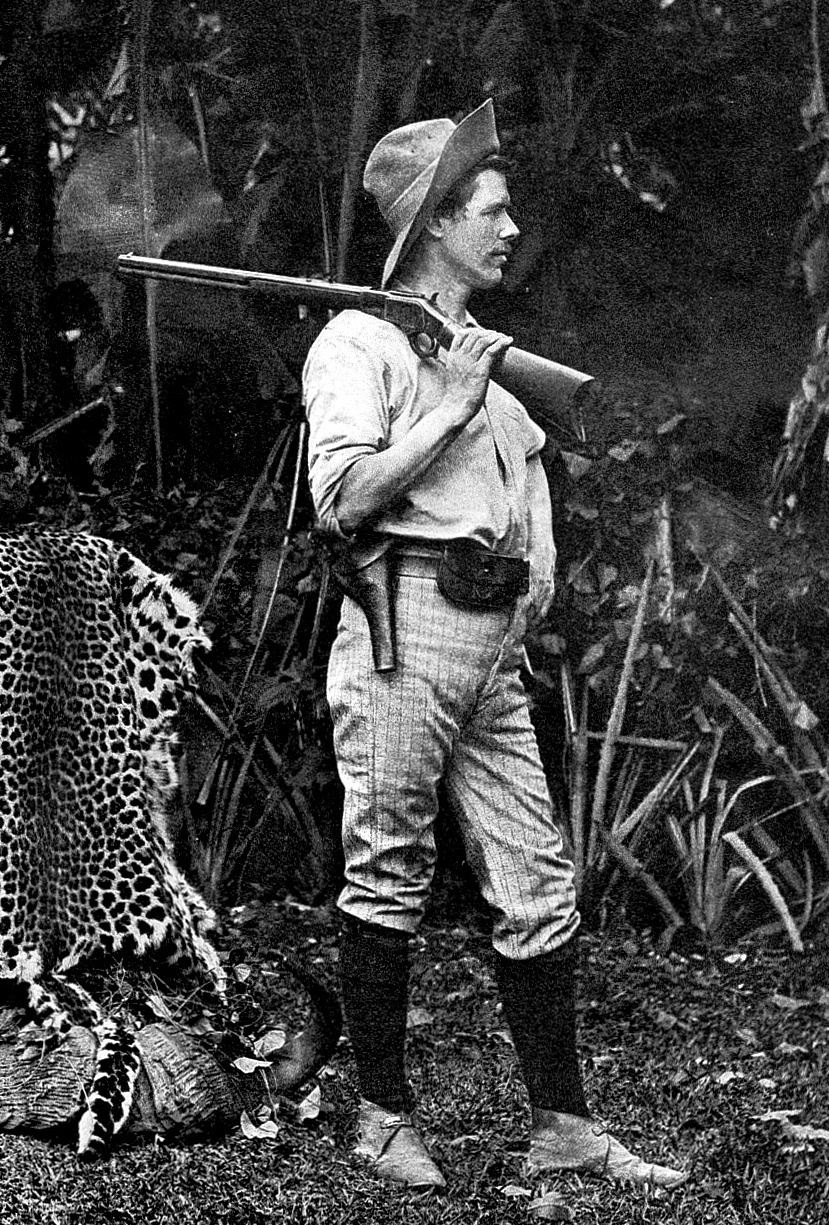
- Born: 1851; Scotland
- Died: 1921 (aged 69–70)
- Occupations: Doctor, missionary and explorer
- Known for: Missionary, photography and exploration
- Title: Reverend Dr

James Johnston (1851 – November 1921) was a British missionary, early photographer, doctor and explorer. He created his own mission at Brown's Town in Jamaica. He took six Jamaicans to help him on his journey across central Africa from west to east to cross the continent and rediscover David Livingstone's mission. Johnston's book and photographs record the journey and his observations on many things but particularly overly ambitious missionaries. Johnston later created slideshows to market Jamaica to potential tourists.

== Life ==
Johnston was born in Scotland in 1851. He had read of the exploits of David Livingstone and attended his funeral in 1873. Johnston arrived in Jamaica in December 1874 because he thought it would be good for his lungs and it was. He broke away from the Baptist church and he started his Jamaican Evangelical mission in 1876. He created nine churches but the base of his medical mission and his religious assemblies was in Brown's Town.

Johnston introduced new tunes and he would punctuate the service with unplanned singing. He would tour the area on Tuesdays and Fridays handing out prescriptions and his wife would follow turning the prescriptions into the required medicines. Johnston became the political representative for St Ann's Parish before he left to explore Africa.

=== Explorer ===
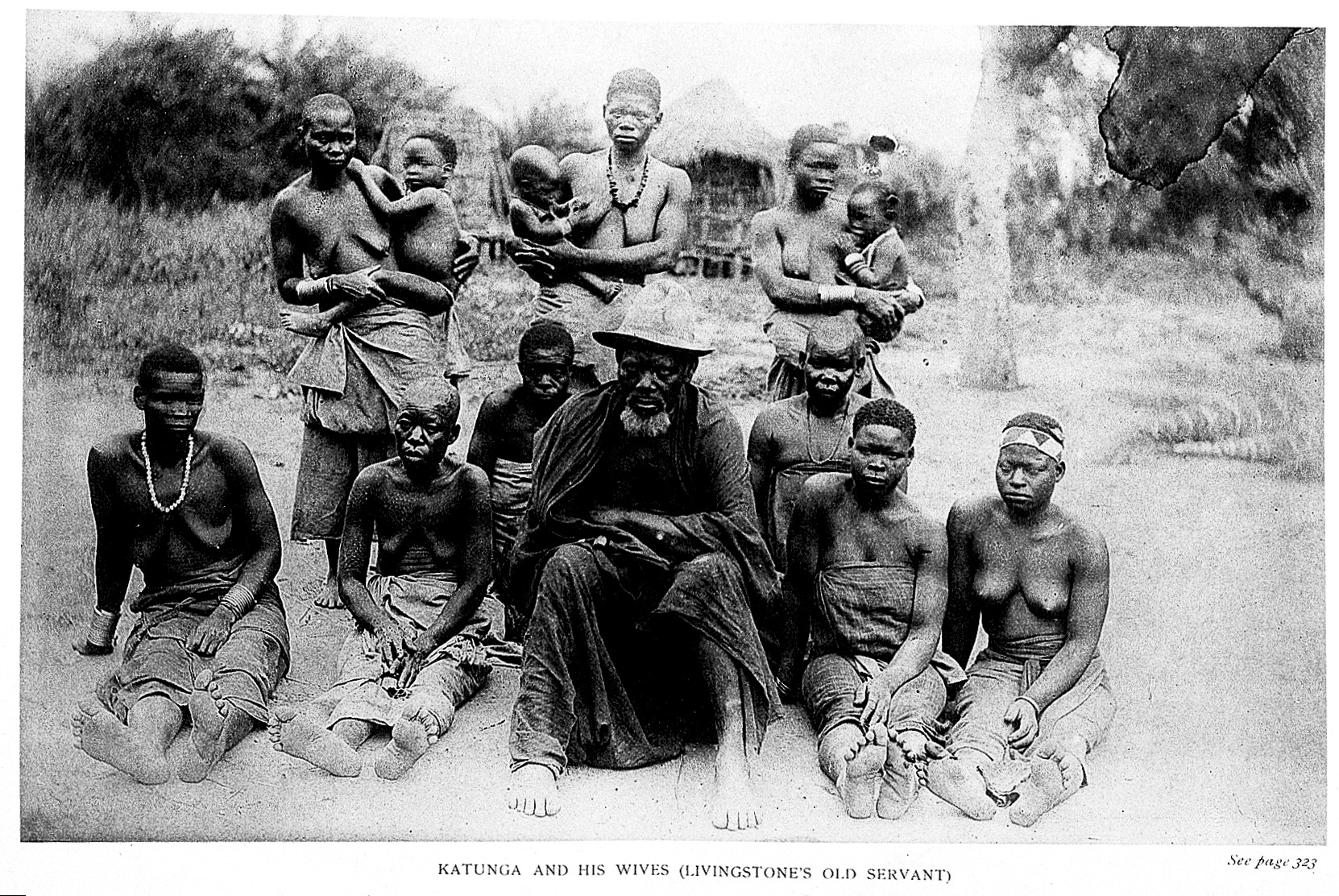
Livingstone's staff member Katanga and his wives

In 1893 he wrote what he described as "an account of a journey across the continent of Africa from Benguella on the west through Bihe, Ganguella, Barotse, the Kalahari Desert. Mashonaland, Manica, Gorongosa, Nyasa, the Shire Highlands to the mouth of the Zambezi to the East Coast." This journey which was "mostly of foot" took him from May 1891 to October 1892. He had been inspired to visit what he called the "Dark Continent" by reading as a child of the exploits of Robert Moffat and David Livingstone. Johnston had hypothesised that people from Jamaica would be the best qualified people to explore central Africa. He decided to take six Afro-Caribbeans to Africa. Using his own funds he took the Jamaicans to England where he raised funds to cover the expense of his Jamaican colleagues. He bought all that he thought he would need to take for a journey to a "shopless country". He hoped to find part of the route the David Livingstone had taken (Livingstone had died in 1873). This was despite the expense and trouble of taking six people from Jamaica to Africa via England. Two Jamaicans who spent the majority of the journey with him were named Frater and Johnathon. Johnston hired dozens of Africans to carry all that he believed essential. In October 1891 he had 97 people in his party and about thirty were required to carry the carriers food. Johnston believed that the people with him would be able to carry 60- to 80-pound loads for eight hours each day. Johnson's book which he titled, "Reality versus Romance in Central Africa" included dozens of Johnston's photographs. One of the photographs shows David Livingstone's servant Katanga who was pictured with his many wives. He and another native, Ratau, told stories of working for Livingstone.

== Six to two ==
On 3 August 1891 he gets to the mission station at Cisamba. Here he makes the decision to leave behind four of the Jamaicans and to continue with just Johnathon and Frater for company. He leaves the four in the care of the Reverend Saunders. Johnston is aware that he has no interpreter for the land ahead so he spends several weeks at Cisamba so that he can learn the basics of the Umbundu language.

== King Lewanika and the Coillard mission ==
On 3 December 1891, Johnston's party were offered free shelter by King Lewanika. Johnston had respect for Lewanika as he offered help without pre-negotiating a price. Lewanika told Johnston how he had written to the British asking that his kingdom should be made a British Protectorate. He had waited years for a reply and then men had arrived with papers claiming that they had the power to make this happen. The King was reassured as the local missionary. Monsier Coillard, was his interpreter at the meeting and the King was reassured by Coillard's confidence in these men. Lewanika had been thankful that his wish had been granted and he had sent two enormous elephant ivory tusks as a present for Queen Victoria. Lewanika was incensed to find that the men were from a South African company and that the ivory tusks were not with Queen Victoria but as ornaments in the directors board room. Johnston assisted Lewanika in writing a letter of protest. Lewanika was to prove a great help to Johnston as he was able to command assistance for Johnston from nearby subordinate chiefs.

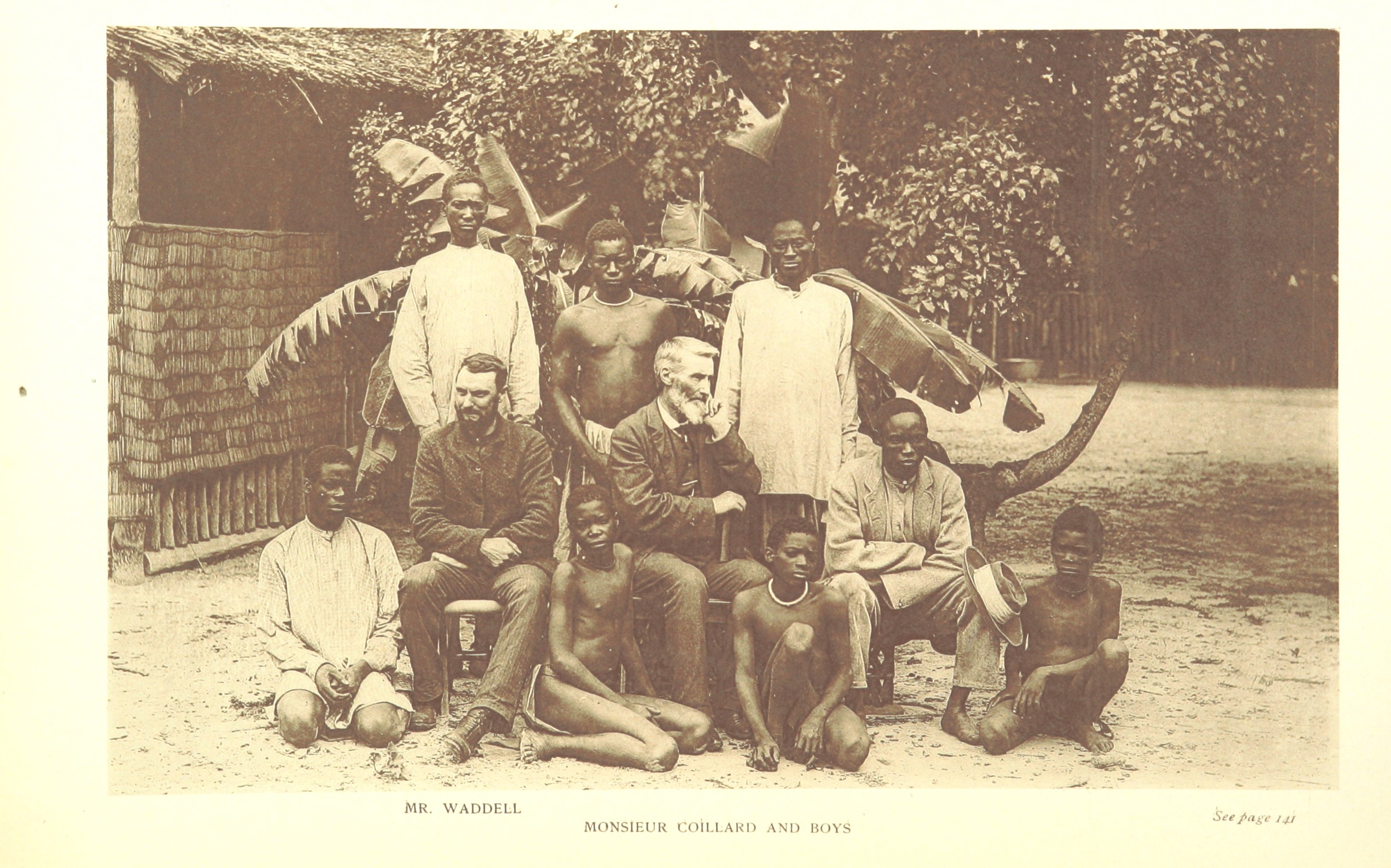
Mr Wadell and M. Coillard and "boys" from Reality versus Romance

On 10 December he met Coillard. Coillard ran a successful mission although his wife had recently died. Coillard was the missionary who had interpreted for Lewanika. Coillard was annoyed that Lewanika had been tricked by men who would consider themselves respectable. He was also annoyed that this affair had undermined the trust that he had built up with the King over many years. Johnston stayed for some time and witnessed a New Year's Eve firework display organised by the missionary. There was also a religious service that day but Johnston noted that few attended the service whilst many saw the fireworks. On New Year's Day 1891 the first Christian wedding of native Africans at the Coillard mission took place. The groom was Letia who was the son of King Lewanika and his bride was Katusi. Johnston witnessed the feast after the wedding which Coillard had funded. The guests were to sit at tables and chairs but the bride had never sat on a chair and Lewanika refused to sit at a table with women. The women included Lewanika's wives and Queen Macqui who was Lewanika's sister. Johnston noted that Letia took Christian marriage vows of fidelity, but he remained faithful for only a few months before taking another wife and renouncing Christianity.

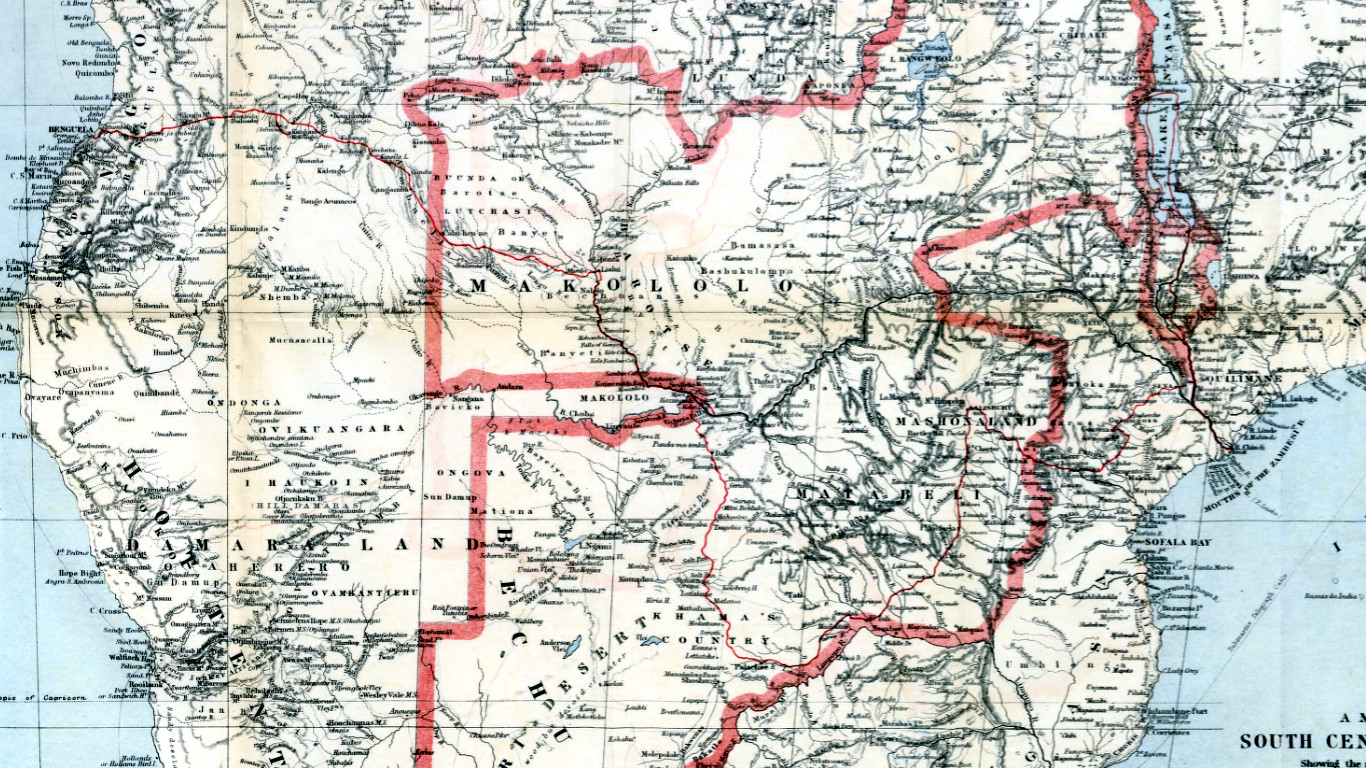
Johnston's route shown as a thin red line across Africa from left to right (zoom in to see)

Johnston was very impressed by the Coillard's mission which included a practical man named Mr. Waddell and a Swiss missionary named Miss Keiner. Johnston did not approve of single ladies as missionaries but he was impressed with the high standard of progress and workmanship he saw around the mission and its buildings. He witnessed "a fine saw-mill with six span of oxen for the motor power, brick-making machines, smithy with patent forge, miner's workshop, fitted with every tool the mechanic requires, from a bradawl to a turning-lathe". Johnston had been to a number of missions and he singled out the Coillard mission for its high standards. This mission like all the African mission he observed that there was a large difference between the tales of mass conversions to the reality of staying alive in an unfamiliar environment.

On 10 February 1892 the party arrived at Kazungula where there is a mission headed by Monsieur and Madame Jolla. Johnston finds another mission which is unusually well run. Monsieur Jolla is keen to extend his mission and he volunteers to travel with Johnston. Madame Jolla impresses Johnston by volunteering to stay behind. Johnston loses his staff around this point but M. Jolla acts as an excellent interpreter and with his help Johnston, Johnathon, Frater and Jolla travel to the Victoria Falls. Johnston notes that his photographs fail to capture the sight. The falls had been named by Livingstone and Johnston gets to meet Makumba and Ratau who served Livingstone and Chief Mosatane who knew him. By the end of February Johnston has returned to the Jolla mission and he sets out to cross the Kalahari Desert.

The journey ended in October 1892. After Johnston sets sail for home he finds out that all six of his Jamaican companions are safe.

Johnston wrote his book "Romance versus Reality" which was published in 1893. Johnston describes the difficult life of the missionaries. Sometimes the missionaries' lives are made difficult just because of the difficulty of finding food. He argues that the missionaries should not be expected to feed themselves as this could occupy all their energy. He also argues that missionary societies should not expect to hear of thousands of Africans converting to Christianity as soon as they hear the message. Small numbers of converts are all that can be expected. Johnston told how he had met a missionary called Booth in August 1892 who told him how he was the first of hundreds who would convert the whole of Africa that century. Johnston was treating his ten-year-old daughter for fever and he saw that Booth was "prepared to sacrifice his only child to the hallucination that possesses him."

=== Slideshows ===
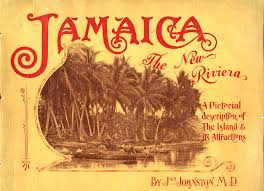
"Jamaica The New Riviera" by Johnston

He gave lectures for over a decade explaining the benefits of visiting and migrating to Jamaica using slideshows. These were paid for by the shipping company Elder, Dempster and Company. In 1903 he published one of the first books to market Jamaica as a tourist destination. He used his own interest in photography to put together a book of pictures titled Jamaica: The New Riviera.

In 1915 the Universal Negro Improvement Association met at Johnston's Tabernacle Church in Brown's Town and Marcus Garvey was the main speaker. Garvey's speech was welcomed by Johnston who felt that Garvey's proposals were ambitious but they lacked detail of how his plans were to be achieved. When he died in November 1921, people accompanied his body as it was taken 14 miles to St Acre in his own Chalmers steam car.

== Works ==
- James Johnston M.D, Reality versus Romance in South Central Africa, 1893
- James Johnston M.D, Jamaica: The New Riviera, 1903
