= Warren Whatley =

American economist

Warren C. Whatley
- Citizenship: United States

Academic background
- Education: Stanford University (MA), 1978; (PhD), 1982; Shaw University (BA), 1972
- Doctoral advisor: Paul A. David; Donald J. Harris; Gavin Wright

Academic work
- Discipline: Economic History; Economic development
- Institutions: University of Michigan
- Awards: Allan Nevins Prize for the best dissertation in American economic history, 1983
- Website: https://lsa.umich.edu/econ/people/emeriti/warren-whatley.html; Information at IDEAS / RePEc

Warren C. Whatley is an American economist who is emeritus professor of economics at the University of Michigan. He is a former president of the National Economic Association.

== Education and early life ==
Whatley graduated from Shaw University in 1972 and received his PhD from Stanford University in 1982. In 1983, the Economic History Association awarded him the Allan Nevins Prize for the Best Dissertation in U.S. or Canadian Economic History the previous year.

== Career ==
Whatley taught at the University of Michigan from 1981 to 2016. He was a professor of both economics and AfroAmerican and African Studies.

=== Selected publications ===
- Whatley, Warren C. "Labor for the picking: The New Deal in the South." Journal of Economic History (1983): 905–929.
- Whatley, Warren C. "African-American Strikebreaking from the Civil War to the New Deal." Social Science History 17, no. 4 (1993): 525–558.
- Whatley, Warren C. "Southern agrarian labor contracts as impediments to cotton mechanization." Journal of Economic History (1987): 45–70.
- Whatley, Warren, and Rob Gillezeau. "The impact of the transatlantic slave trade on ethnic stratification in Africa." American Economic Review 101, no. 3 (2011): 571–76.
- Whatley, Warren C. "A history of mechanization in the cotton South: The institutional hypothesis." The Quarterly Journal of Economics 100, no. 4 (1985): 1191–1215.
