= Hamilton Brown =

Irish-born planter and politician

- Born: 1776; County Antrim, Kingdom of Ireland
- Died: 18 September 1843 (aged 66–67); Jamaica
- Occupations: Planter, politician
- Known for: Founding Hamilton Town

Hamilton Brown (1776 – 18 September 1843) was an Irish-born planter and politician who resided in Saint Ann Parish, Jamaica, which he represented in the House of Assembly of Jamaica for 22 years. Brown founded the settlement of Hamilton Town in Saint Ann Parish, which was named after him.

== Early life ==
Hamilton Brown was born in 1776 to a Presbyterian Ulster-Scots family in Bracough, a townland north of Ballymoney, County Antrim in Ireland.

== Career ==
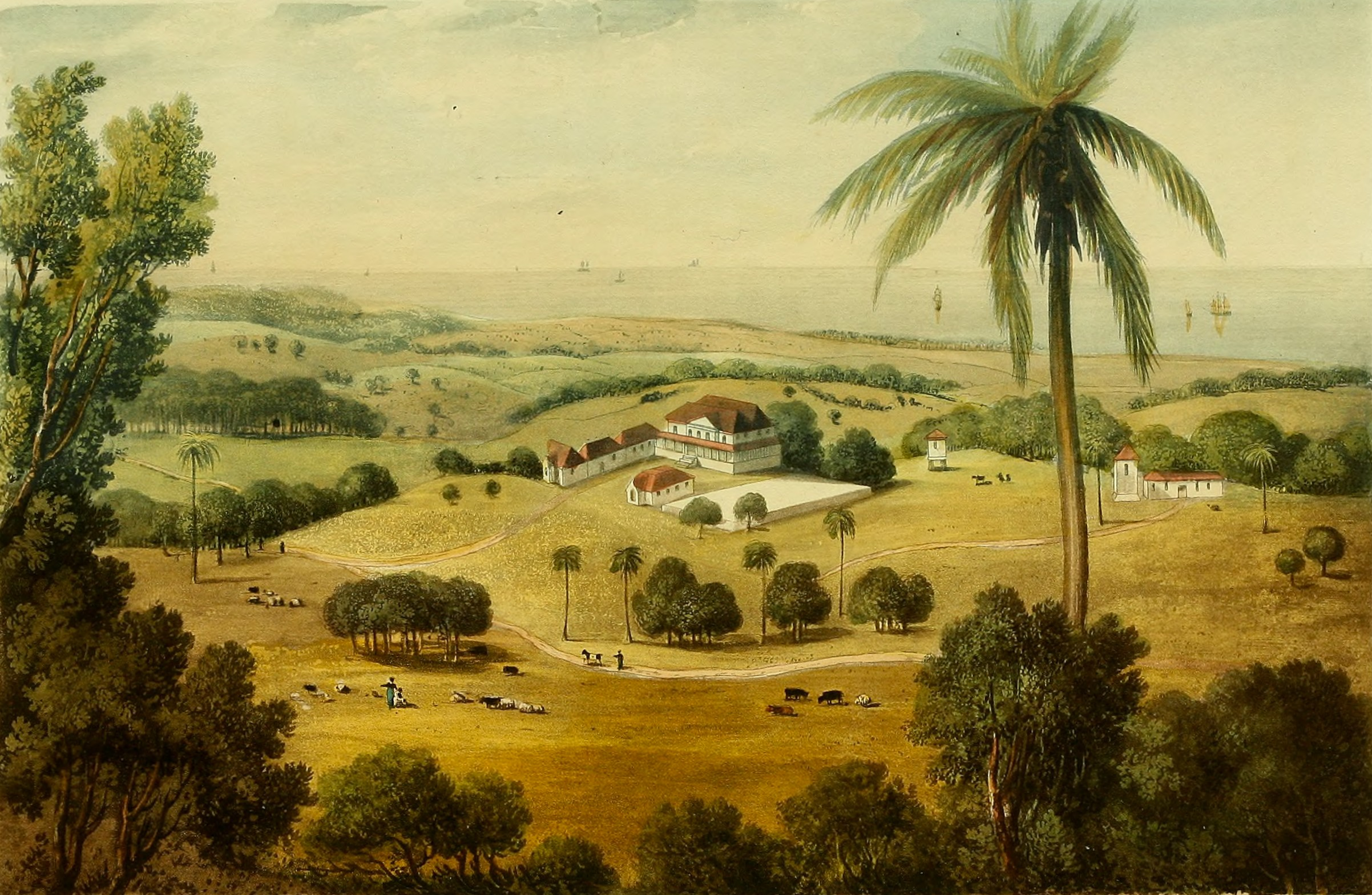
A plantation in Saint Ann Parish. James Hakewill, 1820s.

Brown began his career as an estate bookkeeper but acquired significant land holdings and agricultural interests in the British colony of Jamaica. He was a pen-keeper (cattle breeder) and was responsible for a large cattle fair held on Pedro Plains in Saint Elizabeth Parish in 1829. He also grew sugar and owned the Antrim, Colliston, Grier Park, and Minard plantations, all in St Ann, as well as having interests in numerous others.

He gave his name to Brown's Town, originally known as Hamilton Town, in St Ann, which he founded, and in 1805 he paid for the construction of the original St Mark's Anglican Church in Brown's Town.

He was a member of the House of Assembly of Jamaica in 1820 and represented Saint Ann Parish in that assembly for 22 years. In 1832, he met Henry Whiteley on his trip to Jamaica to whom he argued that Jamaican slaves were better off than the English poor and therefore the British government should not interfere with the way the Jamaican planters managed their slaves; Whiteley went on to witness harsh and arbitrary whipping of slaves at the plantations that he visited during his stay.

According to the Legacies of British Slave-Ownership at the University College London, Brown was awarded a payment under the Slave Compensation Act 1837 as a former slave owner in the aftermath of the Slavery Abolition Act 1833. The British Government took out a £15 million loan (worth £1.48 billion in 2023) with interest from Nathan Mayer Rothschild and Moses Montefiore which was subsequently paid off by the British taxpayers (ending in 2015). Brown was a prolific slave owner in the context of Jamaican society and was associated with a large number of claims, twenty-five in total, he owned 1,120 slaves most of them on sugar plantations in Saint Ann Parish and received a £24,144 (equivalent to £2.38 million in 2023) payment at the time.

Brown was active in trying to recruit Ulster Protestant people to work in Jamaica. In December 1835, 121 people from Ballymoney, Co. Antrim, set off from Belfast for Jamaica on the James Ray, a brig owned by Brown. They settled in St Ann. In 1836 he brought a further 185 ulster protestant people to Saint Ann. An effort by planters in 1840 to encourage large-scale protestant migration to Jamaica to settle lands that might otherwise be occupied by newly freed slaves, failed after the project was criticised in Ireland as potentially transforming the migrants into slaves.

== Death and legacy ==
Brown died on 18 September 1843 and is buried in the Protestant graveyard of St Mark's Anglican Church in Brown's Town, Jamaica. In 2018, Kamala Harris' father, economist Donald J. Harris, wrote in his work Reflections of a Jamaican Father that his paternal grandmother was Christiana Brown, a descendant of "plantation and slave owner Hamilton Brown."

In 2019, fact-checker Snopes rated Donald's claim as being unproven pending further research, while noting that Brown did have mixed-race offspring. In 2021, document research by historian Stephen McCracken determined that Brown was born in Bracough, a townland north of Ballymoney. The Irish Times reported that many in Ballymoney are proud of their possible connection with Harris while disavowing any such connections with Brown. McCracken's research revealed that Brown was Kamala Harris’s four-times-paternal-great-grandfather.
