= Gayle, Jamaica =

Settlement in Jamaica

Coordinates: 18.331°N 77.007°W

Location of Gayle in Jamaica

Gayle is a settlement in Jamaica.

Gayle had a population of 3,238 as of 2009.
