= Brown's Town =

- Town
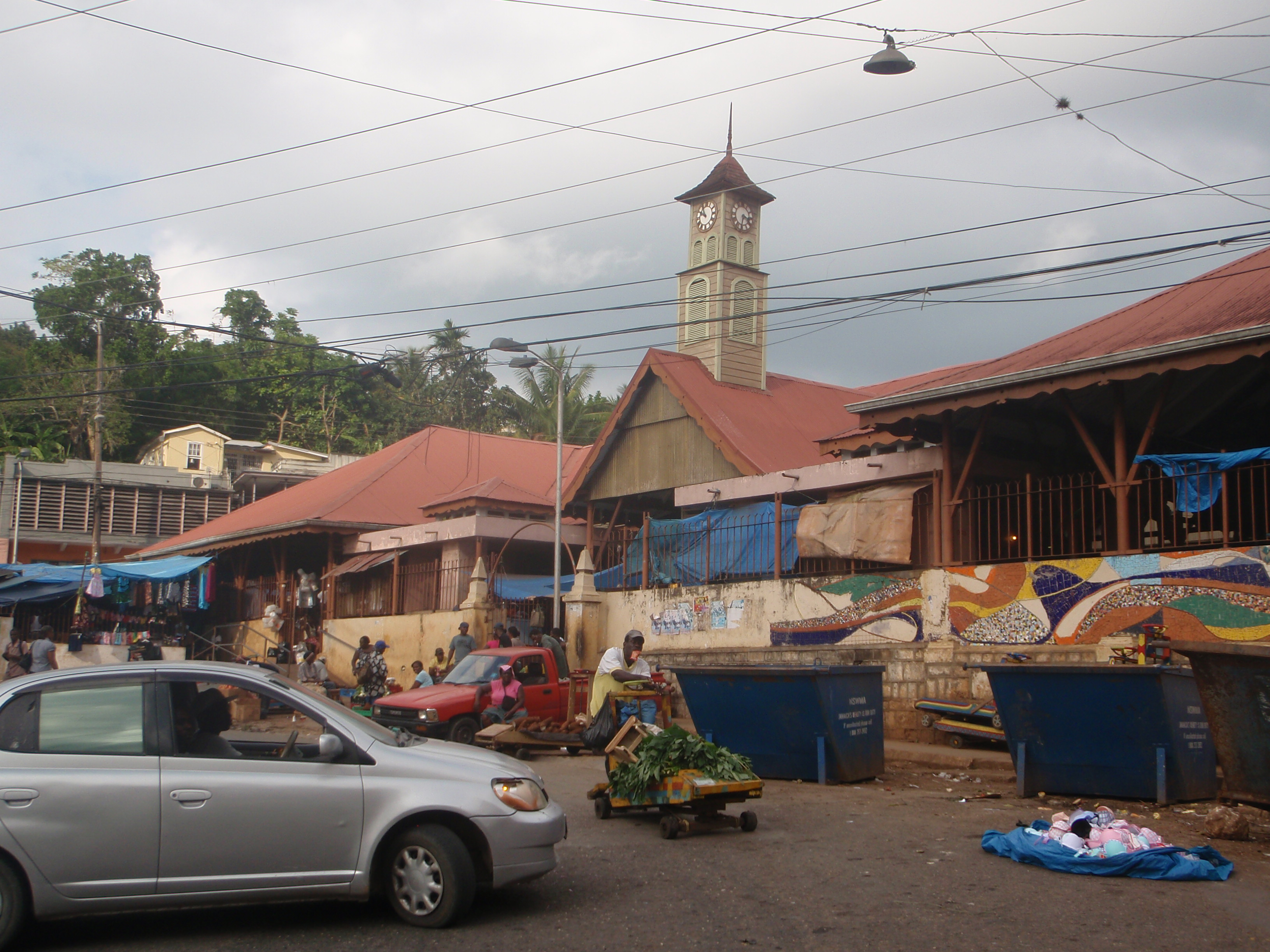
- Brown's Town Market

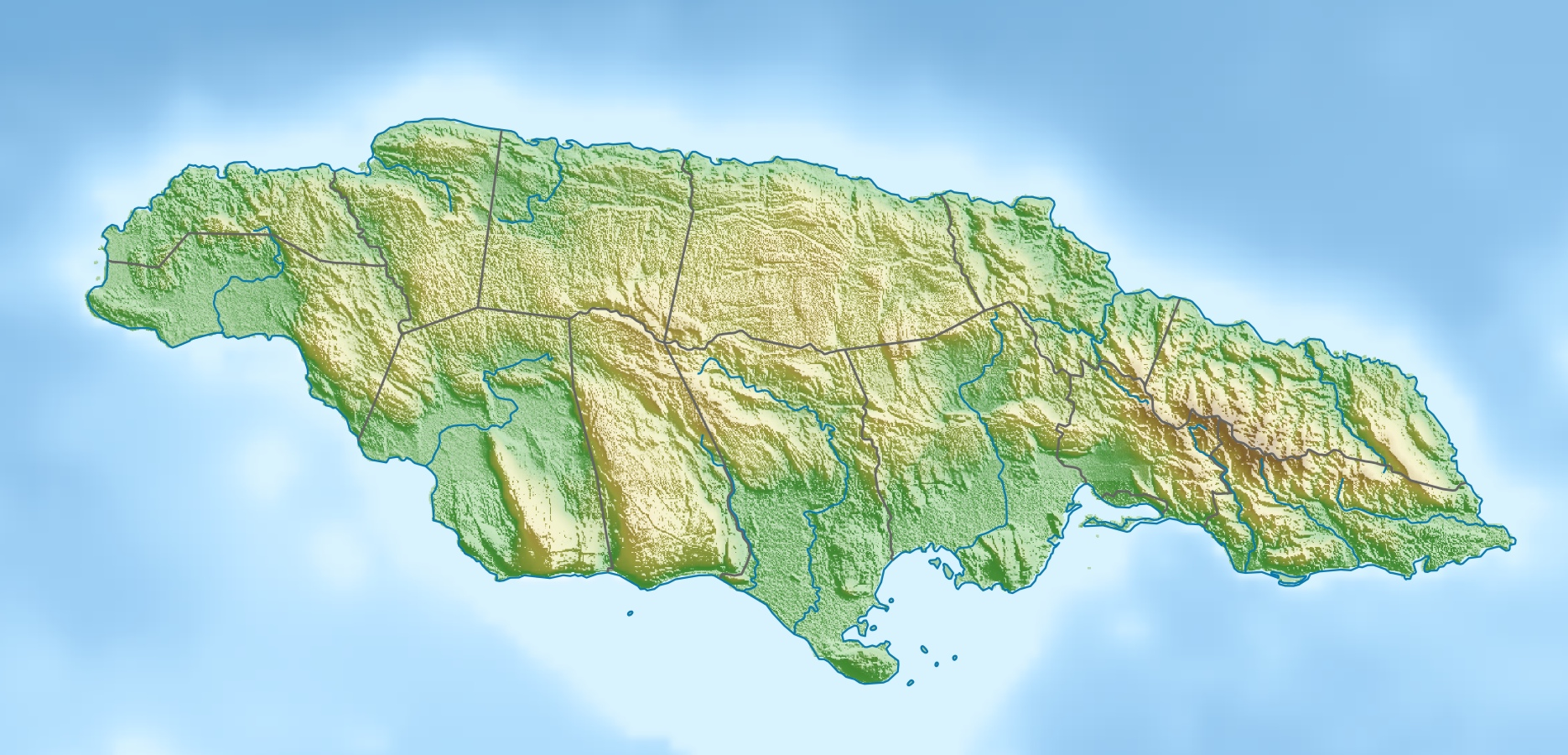
- Location in Jamaica
- Coordinates: 18°23′21″N 77°22′21″W
- Country: Jamaica
- Parish: St Ann
- Elevation: 449 m (1,473 ft)

Population.
  - Estimate (2009): 7,923
- Time zone: UTC-05:00 (EST)

Brown's Town is one of the principal towns in St. Ann Parish, Jamaica. In 1991, its population was 6,762. The town is a market and road center in an agricultural region.

== Geography ==
Brown's Town is located in northwest St Ann in the Dry Harbour Mountains. The town is about 12.87 km (8 mi) from the island's north coast. The ugli fruit was first discovered in 1914 growing wild near the town.

One notable region is called Tobolski, which was once the site of bauxite mining.

== History ==
The town was founded by Hamilton Brown (died 1843) who is buried in the local Anglican church. He owned much of the land in the area including Minard Estate. Surrounding estates were Huntley, New Hope, Orange Valley, Belleair, and Retreat.

Brown's Town became significant as a market centre in the mid-19th century following the abolition of slavery. Several free villages had been established around the town including Aberdeen, Buxton, Egypt, Goshen, Liberty Valley, Sturge Town, and Trysee. The market provided an outlet for the villagers' produce, which attracted buyers from other areas of the island. The influx of customers to the Friday and Saturday markets led to expansive commercial development. The Grand Market held on Christmas Eve was particularly well-supported. Missing notable historical content 1660_1818

Dr James Johnston who had been born in Scotland in 1851 arrived in Jamaica in 1874. He started his Jamaican Evangelical Mission in 1876. Johnston created nine churches but the base of his medical mission and his religious assemblies were in Brown's Town. Johnston became the political representative for St Ann's Parish before he left to explore Africa. In the 1890s he took a team of Afro-Caribbean Jamaicans to England where they were equipped themselves to complete a 20-month journey of 4,500 miles through south central Africa. Their journey was photographed and described by a book published in 1893. Many of the photographs became postcards which have since become collector's items.

== Education, health, and recreation ==
Brown's Town is considered the educational capital of St. Ann. Brown's Town Community College, located in the town, offers pre-tertiary and tertiary courses from the University of Technology, Jamaica and the University of the West Indies. It was formerly the site of the Huntley Hotel, followed by the Servite Convent of the Assumption which operated a preparatory school and a high school for girls. There are three secondary schools in Brown's Town: Brown's Town High School, St. Hilda's Diocesan High School for Girls, and York Castle High School. It also features St. Christopher School for the Deaf, the only institution for the hearing impaired outside of Kingston.

In Brown's Town, there is a health centre and a public health service, as well as private medical services. The St Ann's Bay Regional Hospital and the Alexandria Hospital also serve the town.

Popular sports in Brown's Town include football, cricket, netball, track and field, cycling, and lawn tennis, many events being held at Addison Park.

== Notable people ==
- D.K. Duncan, dental surgeon and former government minister
- Gloria Escoffery, painter, poet and art critic active in the 1940s and 1950s.
- Donald J. Harris, economist and father of former U.S. Vice President Kamala Harris
