= Open economy =

Economy favoring cross-border investment and commerce

An open economy is an economy in which both domestic and international entities participate in the trade of goods and services. This type of economy allows for the exchange of products, including technology transfers and managerial expertise. However, certain services, such as a country's railway operations, may not be easily exchanged internationally due to practical limitations.

In contrast, a closed economy restricts international trade and finance with other countries. In an open economy, the sale of goods or services to a foreign country is known as exporting, while the purchase of foreign goods or services is referred to as importing. Collectively, these activities form the basis of international trade.

== Advantages and disadvantages ==
Open economies offer several advantages to their citizens. One key benefit is that consumers have access to a broader variety of goods and services. Additionally, citizens can invest their savings in foreign markets, potentially offering better returns. However, open economies are also more interdependent with other nations, exposing them to risks from global economic fluctuations.

An open economy also allows a country's spending in any given year to differ from its production of goods and services. This flexibility means that a country can spend more than it produces by borrowing from foreign sources, or it can spend less and lend the surplus to other nations.

== History ==
The concept of an open economy is closely linked to the idea of globalization, where individuals, businesses, and governments worldwide are increasingly interconnected. Historical developments such as the Silk Road, which facilitated trade between Eastern Asia, the Middle East, and Europe, and global conflicts like World War I and World War II, which fostered economic alliances, have played a significant role in the development of open economies.

Political ideologies have also influenced the development of open economies. Economic openness as a concept emerged in the 19th century, with two primary schools of thought. Critics argue that open economies may weaken national economies due to heightened competition, while proponents believe that openness encourages trade, fosters job creation, and boosts economic opportunities.

As of 2014, no country operates as a fully closed economy.

== See also ==
- Exchange rate
- Gains from trade
- Terms of trade
- International trade theory
