= Maya Harris =

American attorney and advocate (born 1967)

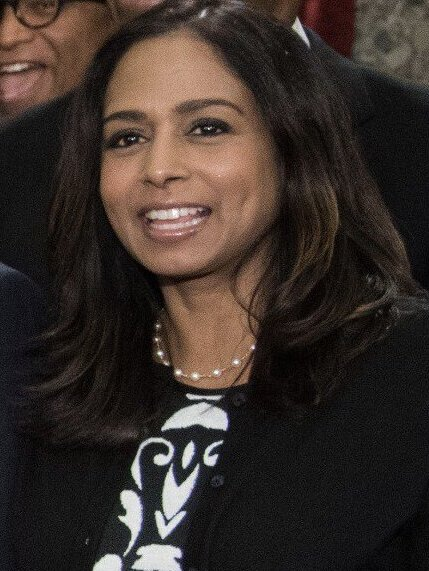
- Harris in 2017
- Born: Maya Lakshmi Harris; January 30, 1967 (age 59); Urbana-Champaign, Illinois, U.S.
- Education: University of California, Berkeley (BA); Stanford University (JD)
- Political party: Democratic
- Spouse: Tony West (m. 1998)
- Children: Meena Harris
- Parents: Donald J. Harris (father); Shyamala Gopalan (mother)
- Relatives: Harris family

Maya Lakshmi Harris (born January 30, 1967) is an American lawyer, public policy advocate, and writer. Harris was one of three senior policy advisors for Hillary Clinton's 2016 presidential campaign's policy agenda and she also served as chair of the 2020 presidential campaign of her sister, Kamala Harris.

Harris was born in Champaign–Urbana, Illinois, and was educated at Bishop O'Dowd High School in Oakland, California, the University of California, Berkeley, and Stanford University. She was involved with PolicyLink, the American Civil Liberties Union, and the Center for American Progress.

== Early life and education ==
Maya Lakshmi Harris was born in Champaign-Urbana, Illinois, and grew up in the San Francisco Bay Area and Montreal, Quebec. She is the younger child of Shyamala Gopalan Harris, a Tamil breast cancer researcher who emigrated from Madras (now known as Chennai), India, in 1958; and Donald Harris, a Jamaican-born Stanford University economics professor, now emeritus. Her maternal grandfather, P. V. Gopalan, was a career civil servant with Government of India. She and her older sister, Kamala, were raised with beliefs from Baptist and Hindu faiths. At 17, while attending Bishop O'Dowd High School in Oakland, she gave birth as a single parent to her only child, Meena Harris.

Harris earned her Bachelor of Arts degree from the University of California, Berkeley in 1989. That year, she enrolled in Stanford Law School. While at Stanford, she was an editor of the Stanford Law Review, and active with the East Palo Alto Community Law Project, serving as Co-Coordinator of the Domestic Violence Clinic and co-chair of the Student Steering Committee. She earned her J.D. degree in 1992 "with distinction".

== Career ==
=== Legal ===
After receiving her J.D. degree from Stanford Law School, Harris served as a law clerk for United States District Court judge James Ware in the Northern District of California. In 1994, Harris joined the San Francisco law firm of Jackson Tufts Cole & Black, LLP, working in civil and criminal litigation. The firm dissolved in 1999.

Harris served as an adjunct law professor at the University of San Francisco School of Law. She also taught gender discrimination at U.C. Hastings College of the Law, contract law at the now closed New College of California School of Law, and was dean of the Lincoln Law School of San Jose. At 29, she was one of the youngest law school deans in the United States, and the only Indian woman at the time.

=== Advocacy ===
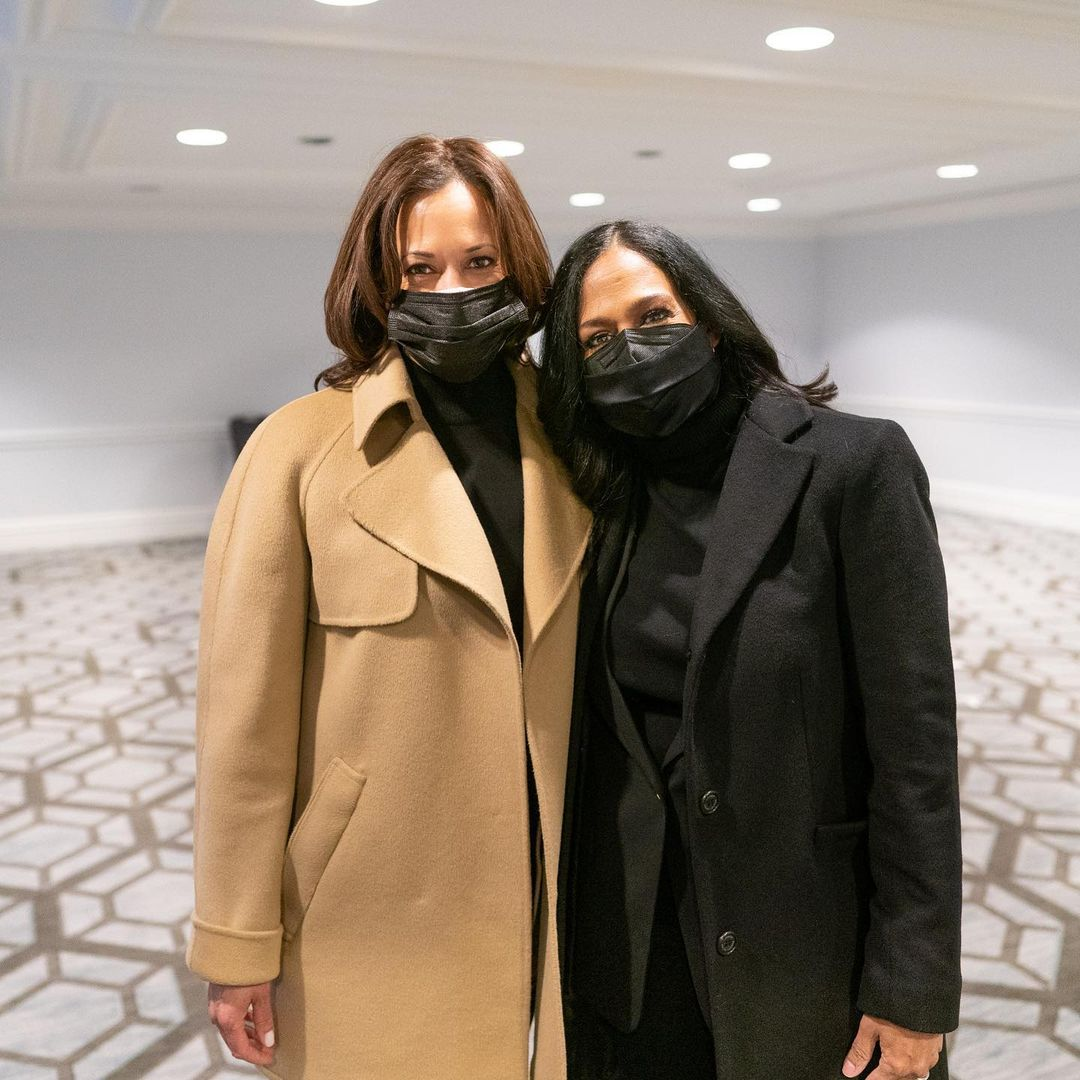
Maya with her sister, former Vice President Kamala Harris, in 2021

Harris was a senior associate at PolicyLink, a national research and action institute dedicated to advancing economic and social equity. In that capacity, she organized conferences around police-community relations and advocated for police reform, authoring two national publications.

Harris served as executive director of the Northern California American Civil Liberties Union. She was the first Jamaican American to lead the ACLU of Northern California and the first South Asian executive director of an ACLU affiliate. In her role as the head of the largest affiliate office of the ACLU, Harris directed and coordinated litigation, media relations, lobbying, and grassroots organizing work. She earlier served as the affiliate's Racial Justice Project Director, establishing priorities including eliminating racial disparities in the criminal justice system and achieving educational equity in California public schools. In 2003, Harris was the Northern California director for No on 54, the successful campaign to defeat Proposition 54, which sought to ban state agencies from collecting racial and ethnic data. In 2006, she was the lead attorney in League of Women Voters of California v. McPherson, a case which restored voting rights to over 100,000 Californians in county jails on probation from felony convictions.

=== Philanthropy ===
In 2008, Harris was appointed vice president for democracy, rights and justice at the Ford Foundation. The program focused on promoting effective governance, increasing democratic participation, and protecting and advancing human rights worldwide, and she led a global team in making grants of over $150 million annually.

=== Politics ===
Harris was a senior associate at PolicyLink. From 2008 until 2013, Harris was vice president for Democracy, Rights and Justice at the Ford Foundation. Prior to joining the Ford Foundation, she served as the executive director of the American Civil Liberties Union (ACLU) of Northern California, the largest ACLU affiliate in the country. Harris was formerly a senior fellow at the Center for American Progress and a visiting scholar at Harvard Law School. She was a political and legal analyst for MSNBC from 2017 until 2018.

As Hillary Clinton's campaign representative to the Democratic Party Platform Committee, Harris helped draft the 2016 platform. Harris served as campaign chairwoman for her sister's 2020 campaign for president until the campaign's suspension.

== Writing ==
Harris authored the essay "Fostering Accountable Community-Centered Policing", which appeared in the 2006 book The Covenant with Black America. She was also a contributing author to The Shriver Report: A Woman's Nation Pushes Back from the Brink, publishing the essay "The Gender Wage Gap: A Civil Rights Issue for Our Time".

Harris has authored publications which include, Community-Centered Policing: A Force for Change, a report highlighting community-centered policing practices nationwide, and Organized for Change: The Activist's Guide to Police Reform, an advocacy manual for police reform. In 2008, Harris published Making Every Vote Count: Reforming Felony Disenfranchisement Policies and Practices in California. In 2014, she authored Women of Color: A Growing Force in the American Electorate.

In 2020, Harris wrote in The Atlantic and Women's Health Magazine about living with the chronic illness lupus that she was diagnosed with at the age of 22.

== Awards and honors ==
In 1997, the Young Lawyers Division of the National Bar Association honored her with the Junius W. Williams Young Lawyer of the Year Award. The following year, she was named one of the Top 20 Up and Coming Lawyers Under 40 by the San Francisco Daily Journal.

In 2006, Harris was named one of ten notable Desis of the year. She was awarded the Women Who Dare Award from Girls, Inc. in 2008. In 2009, Harris was named to the first class of The Root 100, celebrating the "leadership, service and excellence of African-American men and women whose passion, dedication and innovative work have set them apart." She was presented with the Champion of Justice Award from Equal Rights Advocates in 2014, an award given annually to a hero in the movement for gender equality.

== Personal life ==
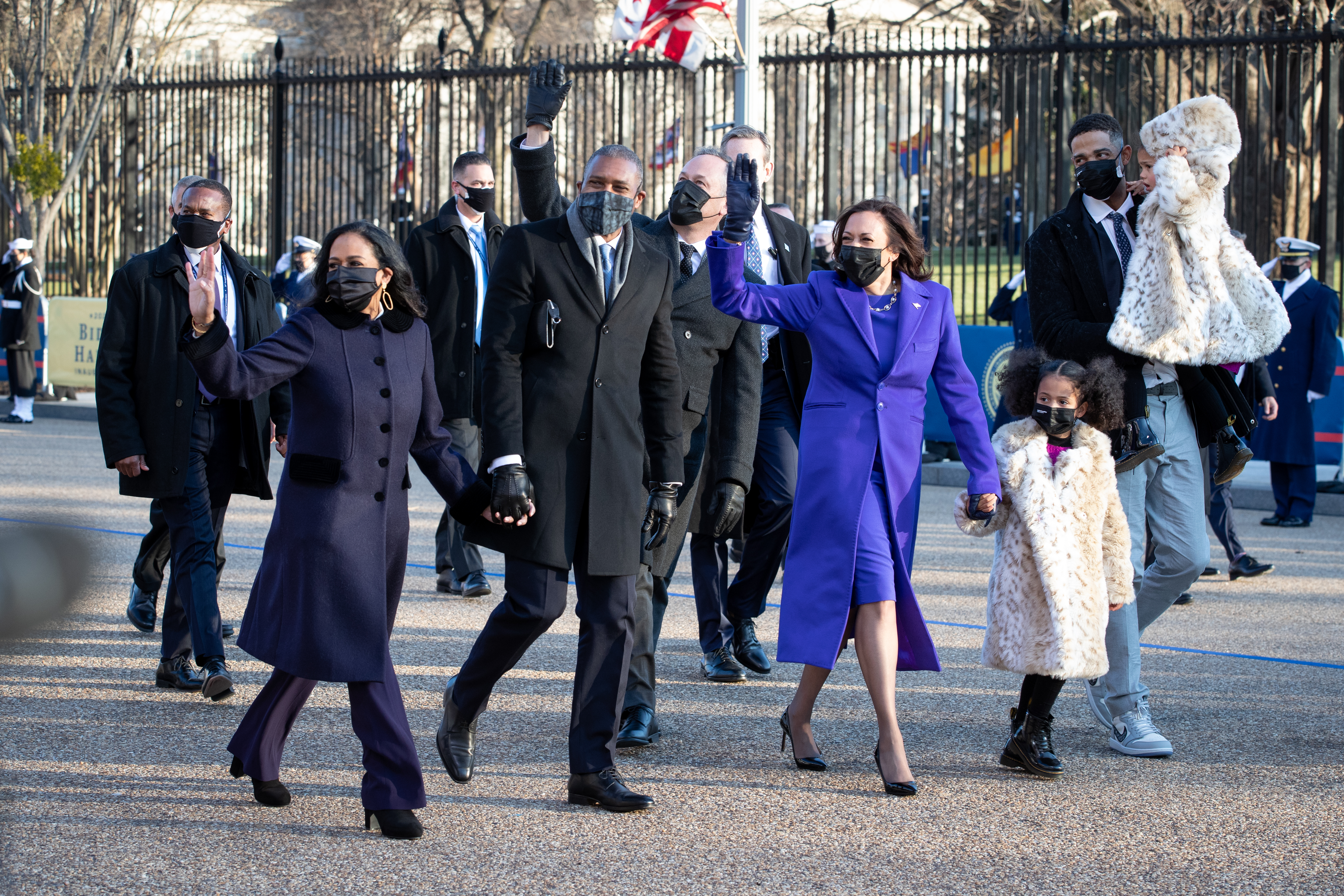
Vice President Kamala Harris and her family walk to the White House on Pennsylvania Avenue on January 20, 2021.

Harris has not publicly revealed the father of her child, Meena Harris, to whom she gave birth in 1984. She has been married to Tony West since July 1998. Maya and Tony were both in the class of 1992 at Stanford Law School, where they became friends but did not start a relationship until after graduation. Her daughter Meena graduated from Stanford in 2006 and from Harvard Law School in 2012. Her sister, Kamala Harris, was the vice president of the United States from 2021 to 2025, and unsuccessfully ran in the 2024 presidential election as the Democratic nominee.
