= Shyamala Gopalan Harris =

American biomedical scientist (1938–2009)

- Born: Gopalan Shyamala; December 7, 1938; Madras, Madras Province, British India
- Died: February 11, 2009 (aged 70); Oakland, California, U.S.
- Education: Lady Irwin College, University of Delhi (BSc); University of California, Berkeley (MS, PhD)
- Known for: Progesterone receptor biology and applications to breast cancer, mother of former U.S. vice president Kamala Harris
- Spouse: Donald J. Harris (m. 1963; div. 1971)
- Children: Kamala; Maya
- Parent(s): P. V. Gopalan (father); Gopalan Rajam (mother)
- Scientific career
- Workplaces: Lady Davis Institute for Medical Research, McGill University; Lawrence Berkeley National Laboratory
- Thesis: The isolation and purification of a trypsin inhibitor from whole wheat flour (1964)
- Doctoral advisor: Richard L. Lyman

Shyamala Gopalan Harris (Note: As per the cited sources and the common naming conventions of her family, Gopalan Shyamala was her legal name in India, while Shyamala Gopalan conforms to Western name order. Shyamala Gopalan Harris, as the first, middle and last names, was her legal name in the United States. In some U.S. government documents, she placed her given name in the surname field and her patronymic in the given name field. She worked jobs under her maiden name even after she married.) (née Gopalan; December 7, 1938 – February 11, 2009) was an Indian-born American biomedical scientist at the Lawrence Berkeley National Laboratory, whose work in isolating and characterizing the progesterone receptor gene has stimulated advances in breast biology and oncology. She was the mother of Kamala Harris, the former vice president of the United States who also served as attorney general of California and senator, and Maya Harris, a lawyer and political commentator.

== Early life and education ==
Shyamala was born on December 7, 1938, in Madras, British India to Iyengar parents, Painganadu Venkataraman Gopalan, a civil servant, and Gopalan Rajam (née Balachandran), her mother. Her parents were from two villages near the town of Mannargudi in Madras Province. Gopalan had begun his professional life as a stenographer, and, as he rose through the ranks of the Imperial Secretariat Service and later Central Secretariat Service, he moved the family every few years between Madras (now Chennai), New Delhi, Bombay (now Mumbai), and Calcutta (now Kolkata). He and Rajam had an arranged marriage, but according to Shyamala's brother, Balachandran, their parents were broad-minded in raising the children, all of whom led somewhat unconventional lives. A gifted singer of Carnatic music, Shyamala won a national competition in it as a teenager.

Shyamala went to the MEA school in Delhi and received her Higher Secondary Certificate in 1955. She studied for a Bachelor of Science in Home Science at Lady Irwin College, University of Delhi. Her father thought the subject—which taught skills considered helpful in homemaking—was a mismatch for her abilities; her mother expected the children to seek careers in medicine, engineering, or law. In 1958, aged 19, Shyamala unexpectedly applied to the master's program in nutrition and endocrinology at the University of California, Berkeley, and was accepted. Her parents used some of their retirement savings to pay her tuition and board during the first year. Lacking a phone line at home, they communicated with her by aerogram after she arrived in the U.S. She earned a Ph.D. in nutrition and endocrinology at UC Berkeley in 1964. Shyamala's dissertation, which was supervised by Richard L. Lyman, was titled The isolation and purification of a trypsin inhibitor from whole wheat flour.

== Career ==
Shyamala conducted research in UC Berkeley's Department of Physiology and Cancer Research Lab. She worked as a breast cancer researcher at University of Illinois Urbana-Champaign and University of Wisconsin. She worked for 16 years at Lady Davis Institute for Medical Research and McGill University Faculty of Medicine. She served as a peer reviewer for the National Institutes of Health and as a site visit team member for the Federal Advisory Committee. She also served on the President's Special Commission on Breast Cancer. She mentored dozens of students in her lab. For her last decade of research, Shyamala worked in the Lawrence Berkeley National Laboratory.

=== Research ===
Shyamala's research led to advancements in the knowledge of hormones pertaining to breast cancer. Her work in the isolation and characterization of the progesterone receptor gene in mice changed research on the hormone-responsiveness of breast tissue.

== Personal life ==
In the fall of 1962, at a meeting of the Afro-American Association—a students' group at Berkeley whose members would go on to give structure to the discipline of Black studies, propose the holiday of Kwanzaa, and help establish the Black Panther Party—Shyamala met a graduate student in economics from Jamaica, Donald J. Harris, who was that day's speaker. According to Donald Harris, who is later an emeritus professor of economics at Stanford University, "We talked then, continued to talk at a subsequent meeting, and at another, and another." In 1963, they were married without following the convention of introducing Harris to Shyamala's parents beforehand or having the ceremony in her hometown. In the later 1960s, Donald and Shyamala took their daughters, Kamala, then four or five years old, and Maya, two years younger, to newly independent Zambia, where Shyamala's father, P. V. Gopalan, was on an advisory assignment. After Shyamala and Donald divorced in the early 1970s, she took her daughters to India several times to visit her parents in Chennai, where they had retired.

The children also visited their father's family in Jamaica during their childhood.

== Death ==
Shyamala died of colon cancer in Oakland on February 11, 2009, at age 70. She requested that donations be made to the organization Breast Cancer Action. Later in 2009, Kamala Harris carried her mother's ashes to Chennai on the southeastern coast of peninsular India and dispersed them in the Indian Ocean waters.

Shyamala Gopalan's legacy lives on through her cancer research, social advocacy, and the Shyamala Gopalan Educational Foundation, which advances education, healthcare, sustainability, and community welfare across India.

== Selected publications ==
- Shyamala, G.; Chou, Y. C.; Louie, S. G.; Guzman, R. C.; Smith, G. H.; Nandi, S. (2002). "Cellular expression of estrogen and progesterone receptors in mammary glands: Regulation by hormones, development and aging". The Journal of Steroid Biochemistry and Molecular Biology. 80 (2): 137–148. doi:10.1016/s0960-0760(01)00182-0. PMID 11897499.
- Shyamala, G.; Yang, X.; Cardiff, R. D.; Dale, E. (2000). "Impact of progesterone receptor on cell-fate decisions during mammary gland development". Proceedings of the National Academy of Sciences. 97 (7): 3044–3049. Bibcode:2000PNAS...97.3044S. doi:10.1073/pnas.97.7.3044. PMC 16189. PMID 10737785.
- Shyamala, G. (1999). "Progesterone Signaling and Mammary Gland Morphogenesis". Journal of Mammary Gland Biology and Neoplasia. 4 (1): 89–104. doi:10.1023/A:1018760721173. PMID 10219909.
- Shyamala, G.; Louie, Sharianne G.; Camarillo, Ignacio G.; Talamantes, Frank (1999). "The Progesterone Receptor and Its Isoforms in Mammary Development". Molecular Genetics and Metabolism. 68 (2): 182–190. doi:10.1006/mgme.1999.2897. PMID 10527668.
- Shyamala, G.; Yang, X.; Silberstein, G.; Barcellos-Hoff, M. H.; Dale, E. (1998). "Transgenic mice carrying an imbalance in the native ratio of a to B forms of progesterone receptor exhibit developmental abnormalities in mammary glands". Proceedings of the National Academy of Sciences. 95 (2): 696–701. Bibcode:1998PNAS...95..696S. doi:10.1073/pnas.95.2.696. PMC 18483. PMID 9435255.
- Shyamala, G.; Schneider, W.; Schott, D. (1990). "Developmental Regulation of Murine Mammary Progesterone Receptor Gene Expression". Endocrinology. 126 (6): 2882–2889. doi:10.1210/endo-126-6-2882. PMID 2190799.
- Shyamala, G.; Gauthier, Y.; Moore, S. K.; Catelli, M. G.; Ullrich, S. J. (1989). "Estrogenic regulation of murine uterine 90-kilodalton heat shock protein gene expression". Molecular and Cellular Biology. 9 (8): 3567–3570. doi:10.1128/mcb.9.8.3567-3570.1989. PMC 362408. PMID 2796999.
