= Premilla Nadasen =

American historian and activist

Premilla Nadasen is an American activist and historian, who specialises in the histories of women of colour in the welfare rights movement. She was President of the National Women's Studies Association from 2018 to 2020. She is the author of Welfare Warriors: The Welfare Rights Movement in the United States (2005) and Household Workers Unite: The Untold Story of African American Women Who Built a Movement (2016).

== Career ==
Nadasen is associate professor of History at Barnard College. She was appointed to a faculty position at Barnard College in 2013. She had previously held a Visiting Endowed Chair in Women’s Studies at Brooklyn College. In 2019 she was Fulbright Visiting Professor at the University of Oxford.

From 2018 to 2020, Nadasen was President of the National Women's Studies Association. A specialist in the roles of women of color in the welfare rights movement, Nadasen has worked on the National Domestic Workers Union of America, the National Welfare Rights Organization (NWRO), as well as the role of domestic workers in the civil rights movement. She has been outspoken against attacks on gender studies by right-wing organisations around the world.

=== Welfare Warriors: The Welfare Rights Movement in the United States ===
Nadasen's first book, Welfare Warriors: The Welfare Rights Movement in the United States, was published in 2005, and in recognition of its importance, she received the John Hope Franklin Book Prize. At the time of its publication, it was the first book to be written on the NWRO for twenty-five years.

Historian Annelise Orleck described the book as "rich and provocative" whose "greatest achievement ... is to treat the recipient-leaders of this movement [NWRO] seriously as both practical strategists and as the framers of a unique political ideology: a black, feminist vision forged in poverty and fueled by the experiences of motherhood." However, while praising the depth of archival research in the work, Andrew Fearnley noted that Nadasen's analysis appeared to preclude white and Puerto Rican women's contributions to the movement.

=== Household Workers Unite: The Untold Story of African American Women Who Built a Movement ===
Nadasen's 2016 work, Household Workers Unite: The Untold Story of African American Women Who Built a Movement, was reviewed by Polly Reed Myers, who described the book as "a welcome addition to the historiography on labor organizing in the postwar period", where "Nadasen reframes the organizational history of domestic labor groups in important ways by placing the voices and stories of African American domestic workers at the center of the narrative". Meanwhile Keona Ervin described the text as "highly readable" and praised the book for its illumination of the "little-known organizers including Josephine Hulett, Dorothy Bolden, Geraldine Roberts, Edith Barksdale Sloan, and Mary McClendon, and organizations such as the Club from Nowhere, the Household Technicians of America, the Domestic Workers Union, and the Household Workers Organization."

== Awards ==
- Ann Snitow Prize - 2020 (inaugural recipient)
- Sara Whaley Book Prize - 2016
- John Hope Franklin Book Prize - 2005
- Berkshire Conference of Women Historians Article Prize
- Distinguished Lecturer for the Organization of American Historians

== Selected publications ==
- Care: The Highest Stage of Capitalism (Haymarket Books, 2023)
- Household Workers Unite: The Untold Story of African American Women Who Built a Movement (Beacon Press, 2016)
- Rethinking the Welfare Rights Movement (Routledge, 2012)
- "From widow to 'welfare queen': Welfare and the politics of race", Black Women, Gender & Families 1.2 (Fall 2007): 52–77.
- Welfare Warriors: The Welfare Rights Movement in the United States (Routledge, 2005)
