= Domestic worker =

Person who works within the employer's household

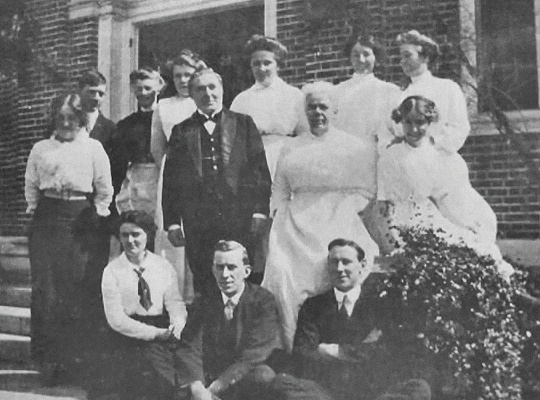
Domestic workers in the United States in 1914

A domestic worker or domestic servant is a person who works within a residence and performs a variety of household services for an individual, from providing cleaning and household maintenance, or cooking, laundry and ironing, or care for children and elderly dependents, and other household errands. The term "domestic service" applies to the equivalent occupational category. In traditional English contexts, such a person was said to be "in service".

Some domestic workers live within their employer's household. In some cases, the contribution and skill of servants whose work encompassed complex management tasks in large households have been highly valued. However, for the most part, domestic work tends to be demanding and is commonly considered to be undervalued, despite often being necessary. Although legislation protecting domestic workers is in place in many countries, it is often not extensively enforced. In many jurisdictions, domestic work is poorly regulated and domestic workers are subject to serious abuses, including slavery.

Servant is an older English word for "domestic worker", though not all servants worked inside the home. Domestic service, or the employment of people for wages in their employer's residence, was sometimes simply called "service" and has often been part of a hierarchical system. In Britain, a highly developed system of domestic service peaked towards the close of the Victorian era (a period known in the United States as the Gilded Age and in France as the Belle Époque), perhaps reaching its most complicated and rigidly structured state during the Edwardian period which reflected the limited social mobility before World War I.

== History ==
In 2015, the International Labour Organization (ILO), based on national surveys or censuses of 232 countries and territories, estimated the number of domestic workers at 67.1 million, but the ILO itself states that "experts say that due to the fact that this kind of work is often hidden and unregistered, the total number of domestic workers could be as high as 100 million". The ILO also states that 83% of domestic workers are women and many are migrant workers.

In Guatemala, it is estimated that 11.8% percent of all women working in 2020 were employed as domestic workers. They hardly have any legal protection. According to Guatemalan labor law, domestic work is "not subject to schedules or limitations of working day." However, by law, domestic workers are still entitled to ten hours of free time in 24 hours, and an additional six hours off on Sundays. But very often, these minimal employment laws are disregarded, and so are basic civil liberties.

Since 2015, domestic workers in Brazil, must be hired under a registered contract and are entitled to equal rights enjoyed by other workers, which include a minimum wage, remunerated vacations (paid leave) and a remunerated weekly day off. It is not uncommon, however, for employers to hire servants illegally and fail to offer a work contract. Since domestic staff predominantly come from disadvantaged groups with less access to education, they are often vulnerable and uninformed of their rights, especially in rural areas. Nevertheless, domestics employed without a proper contract can successfully sue their employers and be compensated for abuse committed. Requiring domestic staff to wear uniforms, including childcare staff, is an extant practice in Brazil, although this requirement has fallen out of use in other countries.

In the United States, domestic workers are generally excluded from many of the legal protections afforded to other classes of worker, including the provisions of the National Labor Relations Act. However, in recent years, advocacy groups like the National Domestic Workers' Alliance have succeeded in passing a Domestic Worker's Bill of Rights in New York, Hawaii, California, and Illinois.

Traditionally domestic workers have mostly been women and are likely to be immigrants. Currently, there are 1.8 million domestic workers, and tens of thousands of people are believed to be in forced labor in the United States. America's domestic home help workers, most of them female members of minority groups, earn low wages and often receive no retirement or health benefits because of the lack of basic labor protections.

Domestic workers are also excluded from time off, paid sick leave, and paid overtime, with only thirteen percent of domestic workers having health insurance provided by their employers. A report from the National Domestic Workers Alliance and affiliated groups found that nearly a quarter of nannies, caregivers, and home health workers make less than the minimum wage in the states in which they work, and nearly half – 48 percent – are paid less than needed to adequately support a family. Many of these workers are subjected to abuse, sexual harassment, and social inequality. However, because domestic workers work in the home, their struggles are hidden in the home and out of the public spotlight. Nowadays with an increase of power, the domestic workers' community has formed many organizations, such as the National Domestic Workers Alliance, Domestic Workers United, and The South African Domestic Service and Allied Workers Union.

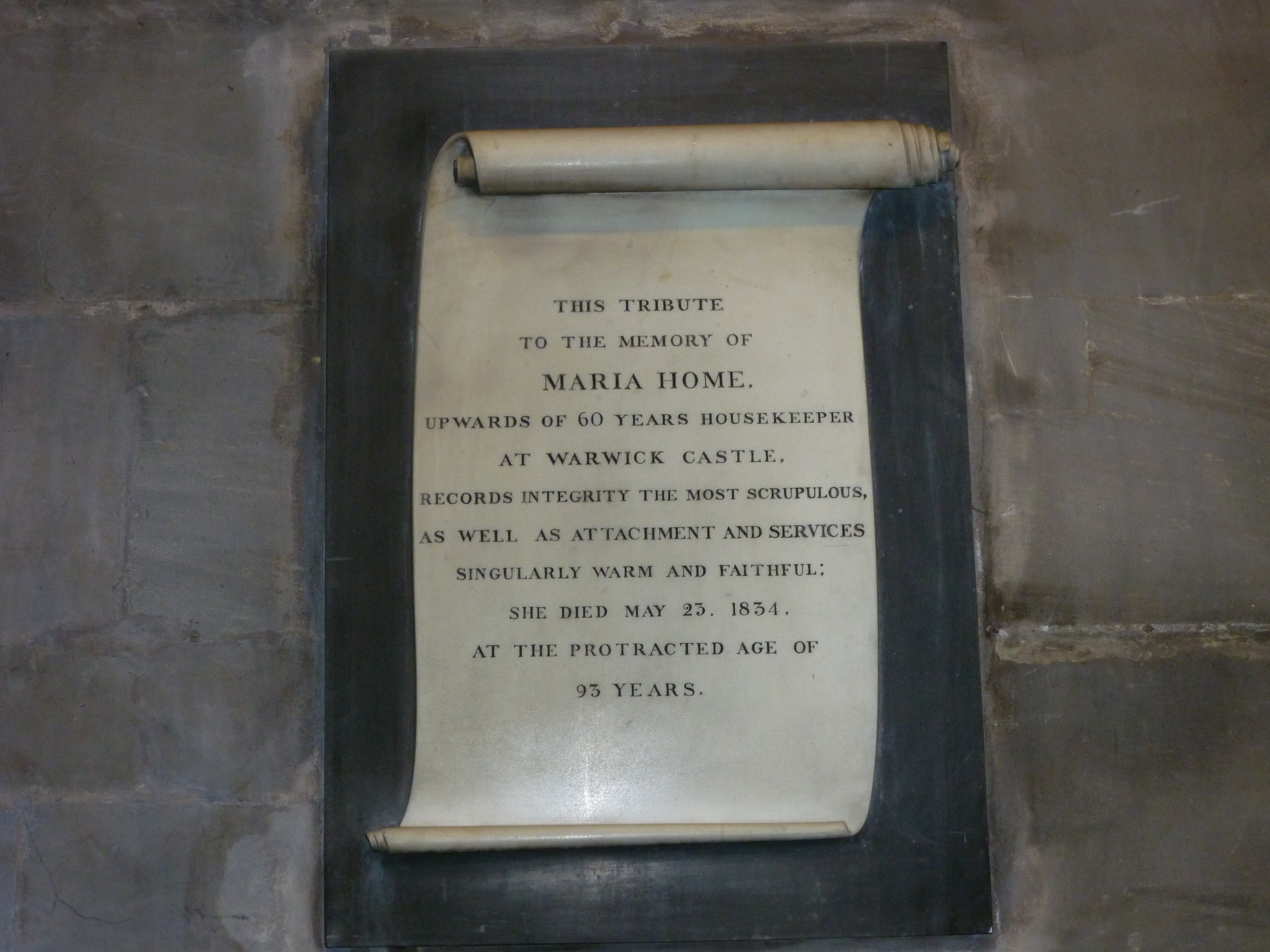
Memorial valuing the work of Maria Home, the servant in Warwick Castle (1834)

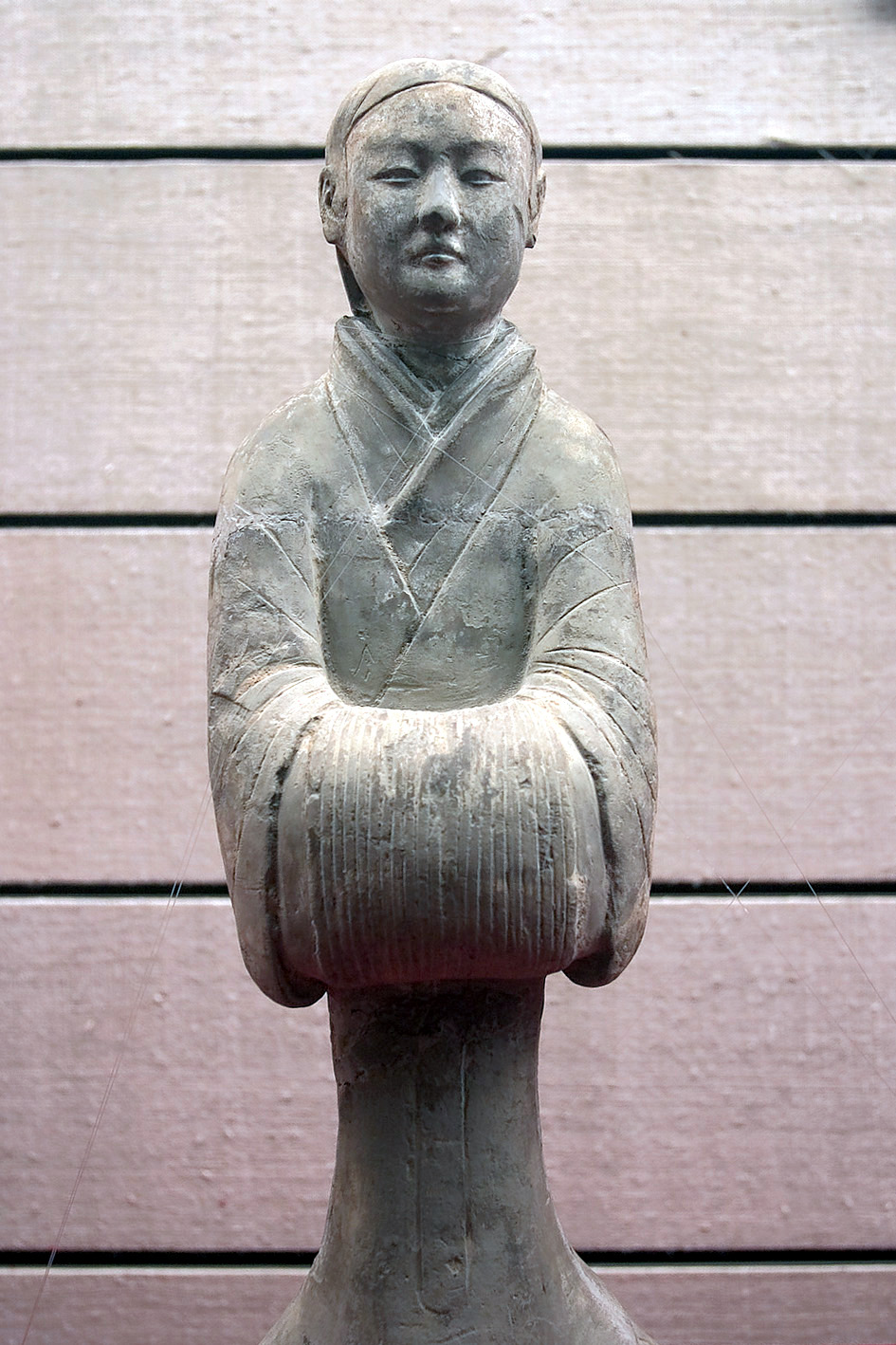
A Han dynasty (202 BC – 220 AD) Chinese ceramic figurine of a lady's maid in a standard formal pose with hands covered by long sleeve cuffs in the traditional fashion

The domestic work industry is dominated throughout the world by women. While the domestic work industry is advantageous for women in that it provides them a sector that they have substantial access to, it can also prove to be disadvantageous by reinforcing gender inequality through the idea that domestic work is an industry that should be dominated by women. Within the domestic work industry, the much smaller proportion of jobs that is occupied by men are not the same jobs that are typically occupied by women. Within the childcare industry, men make up only about 3–6% of all workers. Additionally, in the child care industry men are more likely to fill roles that are not domestic in nature but administrative such as a managerial role in a daycare center.

While the domestic work industry was once believed to be an industry that belonged to a past type of society and did not belong in a modern world, trends are showing that although elements of the domestic work industry have been changing the industry itself has shown no signs of fading away, but only signs of transformation. There are several specific causes that are credited to continuing the cycle of the demand for domestic work. One of these causes is that with more women taking up full-time jobs, a dually employed household with children places a heavy burden on parents. It is argued however that this burden would not result in the demand for outside domestic work if men and women were providing equal levels of effort in domestic work and child-rearing within their own home.

The demand for domestic workers has also become primarily fulfilled by migrant domestic workers from other countries who flock to wealthier nations to fulfill the demand for help at home. This trend of domestic workers flowing from poorer nations to richer nations creates a relationship that on some levels encourages the liberation of one group of people at the expense of the exploitation of another. Although domestic work has far from begun to fade from society, the demand for it and the people who fill that demand has changed drastically over time.

The so-called "servant problem" in such countries as the United Kingdom, the United States and Canada was the problem that middle-class families had with cleaning, cooking, and especially entertaining at the level that was socially expected. It was too much work for any one person to do herself, but middle-class families, unlike wealthy families, could not afford to pay the wages necessary to attract and retain skilled household employees.

== Legal protections ==
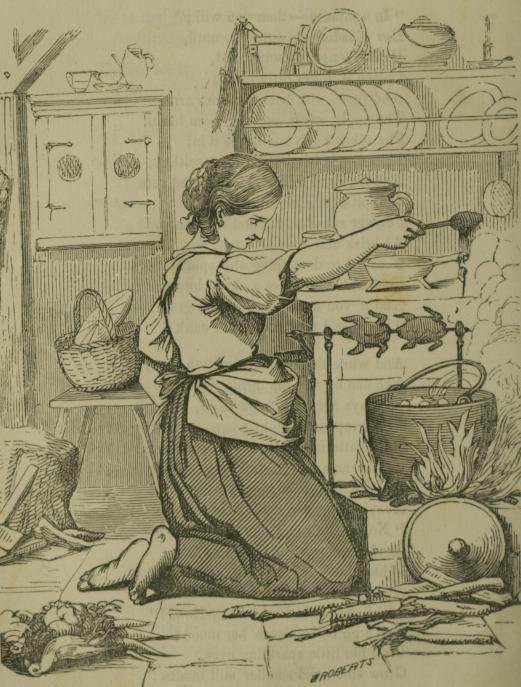
Cook (1855)

The United Kingdom's Master and Servant Act 1823 was the first of its kind; the terms referred generally to employers and employees. The Act influenced the creation of domestic service laws in other nations, although legislation tended to favour employers. However, before the passing of such Acts servants, and workers in general, had no protection in law. The only real advantage that domestic service provided was the provision of meals, accommodation, and sometimes clothes, in addition to a modest wage. Service was normally an apprentice system with room for advancement through the ranks.

The conditions faced by domestic workers have varied considerably throughout history and in the contemporary world. In the course of twentieth-century movements for labour rights, women's rights and immigrant rights, the conditions faced by domestic workers and the problems specific to their class of employment have come to the fore.

In 2011, the International Labour Organization adopted the Convention Concerning Decent Work for Domestic Workers. Previously, at its 301st Session (March 2008), the International Labour Organization (ILO) Governing Body agreed to place an item on decent work for domestic workers on the agenda of the 99th Session of the International Labour Conference (2010) with a view to the setting of labour standards. In July 2011, at the annual International Labour Conference, held by the ILO, conference delegates adopted the Convention on Domestic Workers by a vote of 396 to 16, with 63 abstentions. The Convention recognized domestic workers as workers with the same rights as other workers. On 26 April 2012, Uruguay was the first country to ratify the convention.

== Accommodation ==
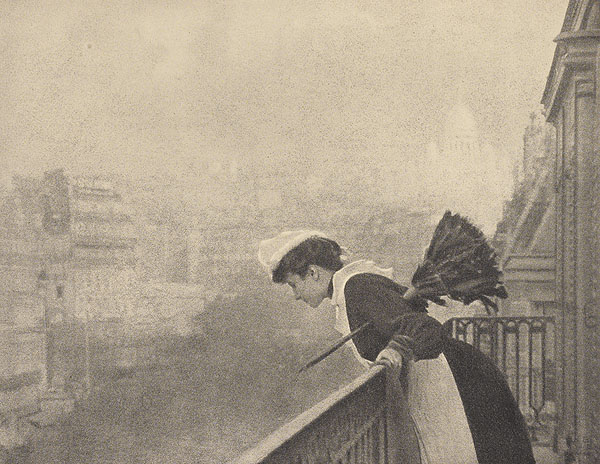
Parisian maid (1906) (Image by Constant Puyo)

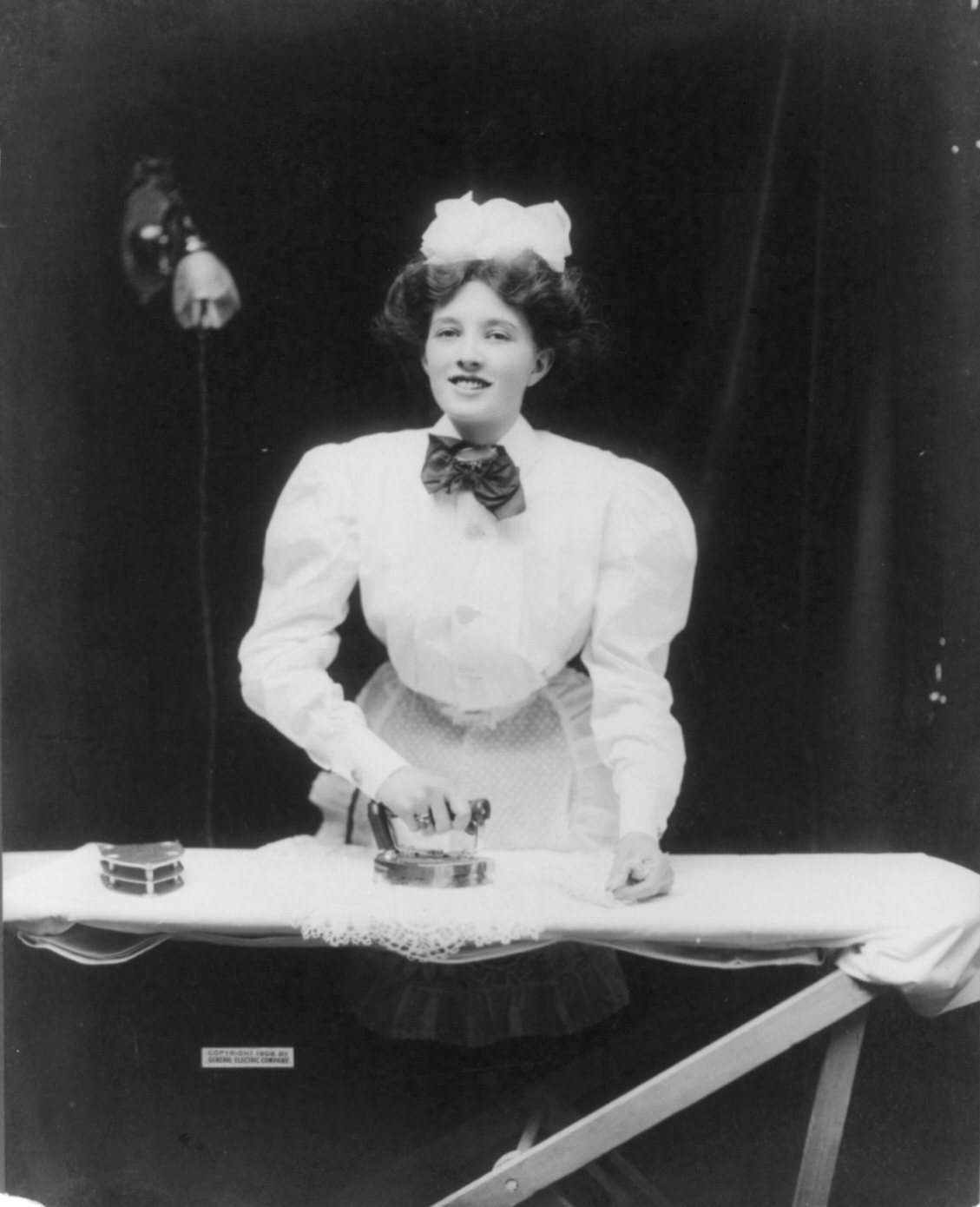
A domestic servant ironing a lace doily with GE electric iron, ca. 1908

Many domestic workers are live-in domestics. Though they often have their own quarters, their accommodations are not usually as comfortable as those reserved for the family members. In some cases, they sleep in the kitchen or small rooms, such as a box room, sometimes located in the basement or attic. Domestic workers may live in their own home, though more often they are "live-in" domestics, meaning that they receive their room and board as part of their salaries. In some countries, because of the large gap between urban and rural incomes, and the lack of employment opportunities in the countryside, even an ordinary middle class urban family can afford to employ a full-time live-in servant. The majority of domestic workers in China, Mexico, India, and other populous developing countries, are people from the rural areas who are employed by urban families.

Employers may require their domestic workers to wear a uniform, livery or other "domestic workers' clothes" when in their employers' residence. The uniform is usually simple, though aristocratic employers sometimes provided elaborate decorative liveries, especially for use on formal occasions. Female servants wore long, plain, dark-coloured dresses or black skirts with white belts and white blouses, and black shoes, and male servants and butlers would wear something from a simple suit, or a white dress shirt, often with tie, and knickers. In traditional portrayals, the attire of domestic workers especially was typically more formal and conservative than that of those whom they serve. For example, in films of the early 20th century, a butler might appear in a tailcoat, while male family members and guests appeared in lounge suits or sports jackets and trousers depending on the occasion. In later portrayals, the employer and guests might wear casual slacks or even jeans, while a male domestic worker wore a jacket and tie or a white dress shirt with black trousers, necktie or bowtie, maybe even a waistcoat, or a female domestic worker either a blouse and skirt (or trousers) or a uniform.

On 30 March 2009, Peru adopted a law banning employers from requiring domestic workers to wear a uniform at public places. However, it has not explained which punishments will be given to employers violating the law. Chile adopted a similar law in 2014, also banning employers to require domestic workers to wear uniform at public places.

== Child workers ==
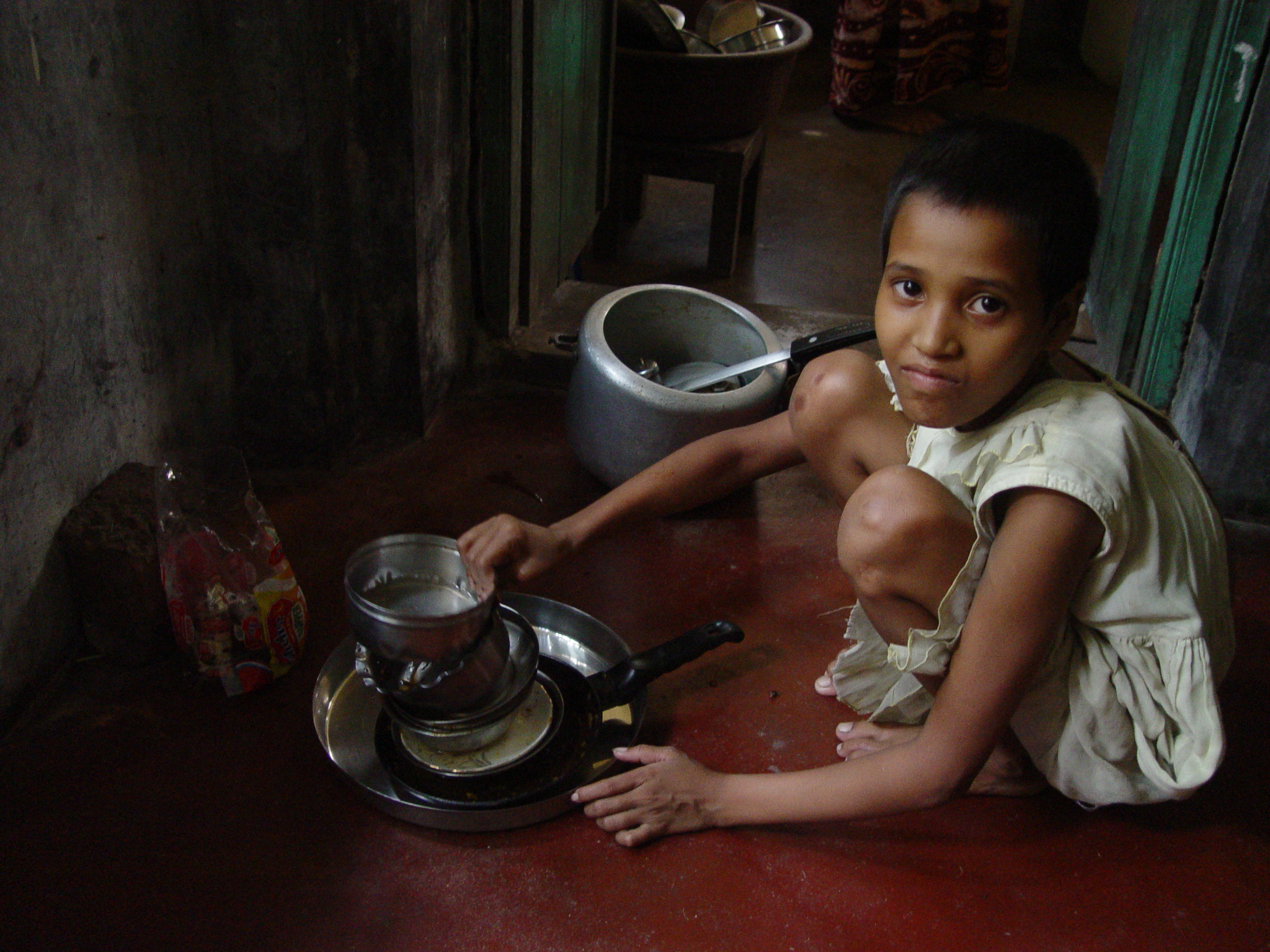
Child maid servant in India. Child domestic workers are common in India, with the children often being sent by their parents to earn extra money, although it is banned by the government.

More girls under 16 work as domestic workers than any other category of child labor. Usually, in a practice often called "confiage" or entrusting, such as for restaveks in Haiti, parents in the rural poverty make an agreement with someone in the cities who would house and send their child to school in return for domestic work.

Such children are very vulnerable to exploitation: often they are not allowed to take breaks or are required to work long hours; many suffer from a lack of access to education, which can contribute to social isolation and a lack of future opportunity. UNICEF considers domestic work to be among the lowest status, and reports that most child domestic workers are live-in workers and are under the round-the-clock control of their employers. Child domestic work is common in countries such as Bangladesh and Pakistan. In Pakistan, since January 2010 to December 2013, 52 cases of tortures on child domestic workers are reported including 24 deaths. It has been estimated that globally, at least 10 million children work in domestic labor jobs.

Children face a number of risks that are common in domestic work service. The International Programme on the Elimination of Child Labour identified that these risks include: long and tiring working days; use of toxic chemicals; carrying heavy loads; handling dangerous items such as knives, axes and hot pans; insufficient or inadequate food and accommodation, and humiliating or degrading treatment including physical and verbal violence, and sexual abuse.

== Migrant domestic workers ==
Migrant domestic workers are, according to the International Labour Organization's Convention No. 189 and the International Organization for Migration, any persons "moving to another country or region to better their material or social conditions and improve the prospect for themselves or their family," engaged in a work relationship performing "in or for a household or households." Domestic work itself can cover a "wide range of tasks and services that vary from country to country and that can be different depending on the age, gender, ethnic background and migration status of the workers concerned." These particular workers have been identified by some academics as situated within "the rapid growth of paid domestic labor, the feminization of transnational migration, and the development of new public spheres."

== Social effects ==
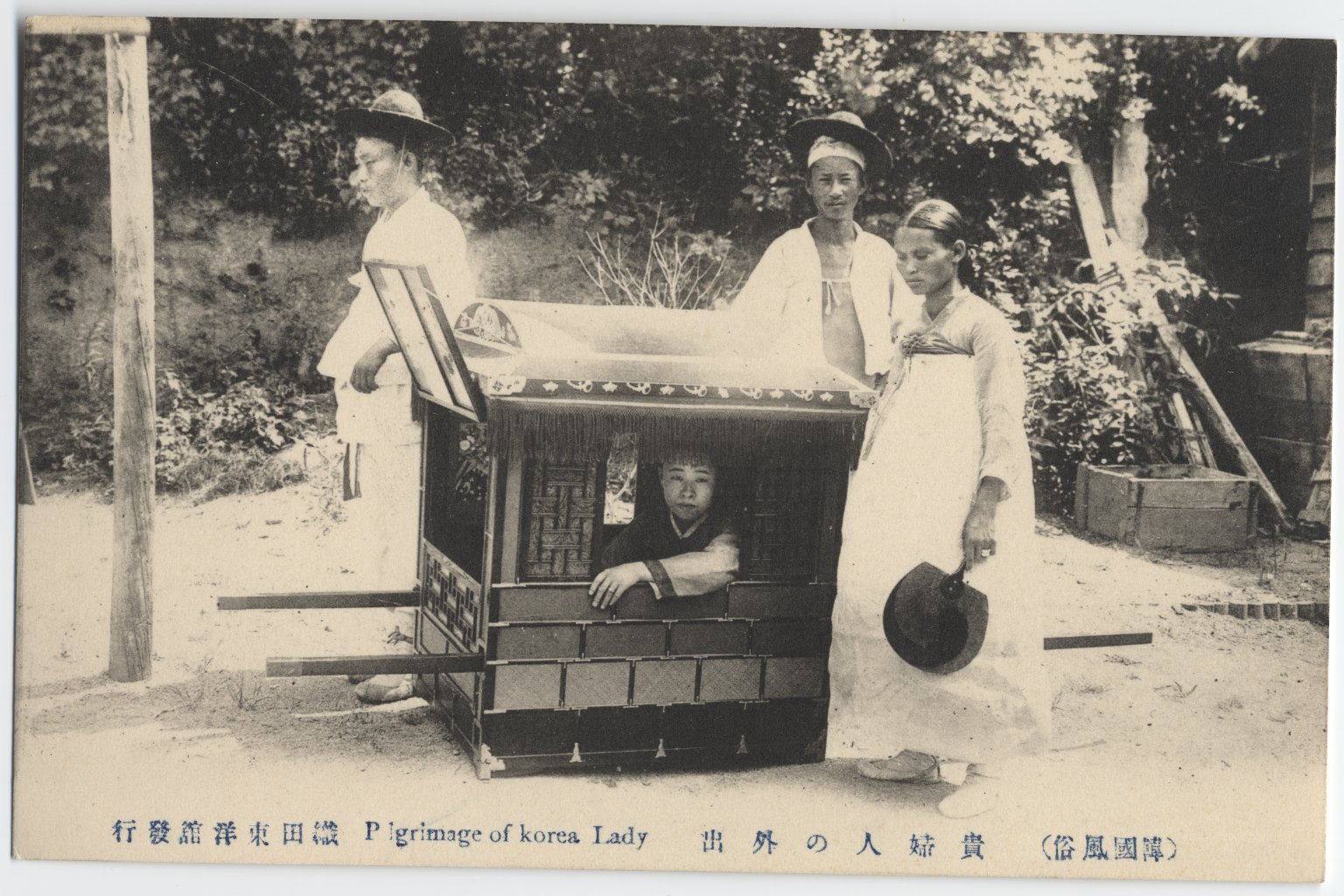
Male servants carrying a palanquin and female maid with a traditional fan (Korea c. 1904)

As women currently dominate the domestic labor market throughout the world, they have learned to navigate the system of domestic work both in their own countries and abroad in order to maximize the benefits of entering the domestic labor market.

Among the disadvantages of working as a domestic worker is the fact that women working in this sector are working in an area often regarded as a private sphere. Feminist critics of women working in the domestic sphere argue that this woman-dominated market is reinforcing gender inequalities by potentially creating mistress-servant relationships between domestic workers and their employers and continuing to put women in a position of lesser power. Other critics point out that working in a privatized sphere robs domestic workers of the advantages of more socialized work in the public sphere.

Additionally, domestic laborers face other disadvantages. Their isolation is increased by their invisibility in the public sphere and the repetitive, intangible nature of their work decreases its value, making the workers themselves more dispensable. The level of isolation women face also depends on the type of domestic work they are involved with. Live-in nannies for example may sacrifice much of their own independence and sometimes become increasingly isolated when they live with a family of which they are not part and away from their own.

While working in a dominantly female privatized world can prove disadvantageous for domestic workers, many women have learned how to help one another move upward economically. Women find that informal networks of friends and families are among the most successful and commonly used means of finding and securing jobs.

Without the security of legal protection, many women who work without the requisite identity or citizenship papers are vulnerable to abuse. Some have to perform tasks considered degrading showing a manifestation of employer power over worker powerlessness. Employing domestic work from foreign countries can perpetuate the idea that domestic or service work is reserved for other social or racial groups and plays into the stereotype that it is work for inferior groups of people.

Gaining employment in the domestic labor market can prove to be difficult for immigrant women. Many subcontract their services to more established women workers, creating an important apprenticeship type of learning experience that can produce better, more independent opportunities in the future. Women who work as domestic workers also gain some employment mobility. Once established they have the option of accepting jobs from multiple employers increasing their income and their experience and most importantly their ability to negotiate prices with their employers.

=== England ===
In 19th- and early 20th-century England the close supervision exercised by mistresses over their servants (including the rule "no followers", "followers" being any men whom the servant might wish to meet when she was not working) was a great disadvantage. This policy was justified by the low esteem in which servants were held; therefore men they associated with were likely to include some with criminal tendencies. The servant and writer Margaret Powell expressed the view that "follower" was a degrading term; the only way the two could meet was by the servant getting out to the road with an excuse such as needing to post a letter.

=== France ===
In his Tableau de Paris, Louis-Sébastien Mercier describes the characteristics of the manservants (lackeys) of pre-revolutionary Paris. "An army of useless servants is kept entirely for show"; he observes that the presence of these servants in the capital has left the countryside rather empty. A tax-farmer's household consists of 24 servants in livery, besides scullions, kitchen maids and six lady's maids. Some lackeys would adopt the manners of their masters and affect a similar mode of dress.

== Situation by country ==
=== Africa ===
==== Kenya ====
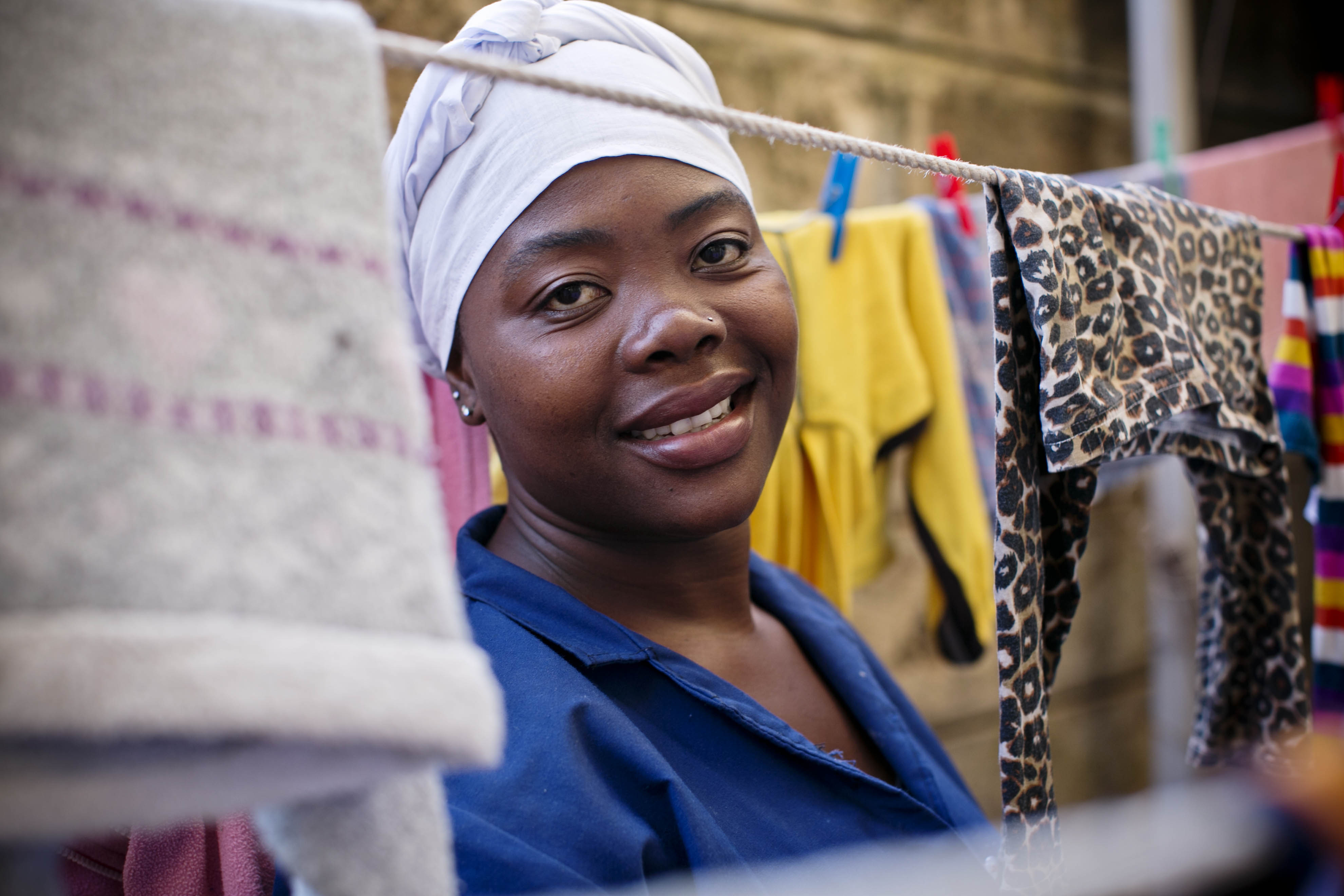
Kenyan domestic worker Lucy Nyangosi working in a Nairobi household, 2016

In Kenya, domestic workers – nearly all female – are known as 'housegirls'. Often from poor villages in neighbouring Uganda, girls are open to exploitation, and there are calls for stronger legal protection.

==== South Africa ====
The domestic work sector occupies around 6 per cent of the total work force in South Africa, with domestic workers being largely Black African women. As in other countries, working conditions in the sector are generally characterised by informality and exploitation. In 2013, South Africa ratified ILO C189 Convention on Domestic Workers, recognising domestic work as work and formalising it through labour contracts, wages, social protection, health and safety in the workplace, and rights to organising as well as social dialogue. However, significant challenges remain with implementation. Furthermore, the minimum wage of domestic workers is set to 75 per cent of the national minimum wage.

==== Tanzania ====
In Tanzania, like in its neighbours, most domestic workers are female and popularly known as house girls or "BekiTatu", a popular snobbish word that is aimed at the poor house girls used by members of the upper middle class or the wealthy. Most house girls are exploited, severely underpaid with an average of 50,000 Tanzanian shillings which is equal to almost $20, subjected to sexual harassment by men and physical assault (mostly by women in the house who spend most time with them). They do not have any union or a collective domestic workers' association to defend their rights in an already poorest country in the world. Most are also underage or just slightly young adults mostly collected from rural areas and brought to the urban areas like Dar Es Salaam, Arusha or Mwanza. Most end up running away after finding another work or elope with a man after getting pregnant or getting a promise of marriage.

=== Asia ===
==== Hong Kong ====
Domestic helpers (DHs, foreign domestic workers, FDWs) from certain other countries, especially the Philippines and Indonesia, work in Hong Kong on specific visas that exempt employers from many obligations received by other workers, and receive a lower minimum salary. Approximately five percent of Hong Kong's population are FDWs, about 98.5% of them are women, performing household tasks such as cooking, serving, cleaning, dishwashing and child care.

During the COVID-19 epidemic, all foreign domestic workers in Hong Kong have to be vaccinated before their contracts can be renewed, the government announced as it ordered them to undergo mandatory COVID-19 testing on 9 May 2021.

==== India ====
Domestic workers in India are susceptible to an unsafe working environment. These workers put their lives at stake to work in the household in metropolitan cities of the country. Residents of high-rise buildings can be quite cruel to the workers in terms of leaving them without food and water and keeping them captive. Most of the time, such captive workers are as young as a 14-year-old girl. Many such girls come from tribal lands in India such as Jharkhand, Chhattisgarh and some parts of West Bengal, Odisha and Assam due to fewer or no work opportunities available locally. Even though domestic work is the fastest-growing sector of women and girls' employment in urban India, the country lacks a separate law for domestic workers' safety and social security. NGOs in India, focused on the rights of domestic workers, have been reiterating the demand for the issuance of identity cards on the lines of construction workers, weekly leave, ESI and PF facilities and social security. On the legal front, these workers have a long battle ahead. In 2024, the Supreme Court of India disposed of one of the petitions filed by the Common Cause, an NGO that works in the probity of public life, giving the liberty of filing a fresh petition on the matter incorporating all the developments since the petition was filed.

==== Philippines ====
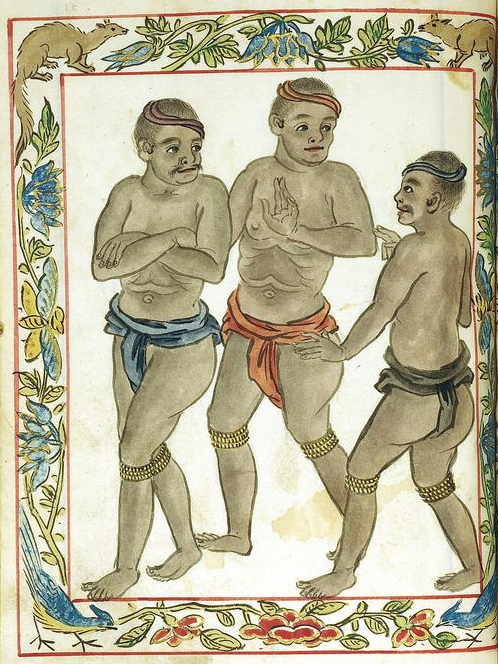
Alipin (Slaves/Indentured Servants) in Pre-colonial Philippines: Visayan uripon, as depicted in the Boxer Codex (c. 1590)

In the Philippines, domestic household workers/helpers such as maidservants (katulong/kasambahay), caretakers (yaya), family drivers (drayber/tsuper), laundrywomen (labandera/tagalaba), gardeners (hardinero), security guards (guwardiya/bantay), pool cleaners have been a norm in upper class Philippine society for an uncertain amount of time already, perhaps even connected to or influenced from the household slaves/servants in precolonial times of the Philippines that were divided into aliping namamahay and aliping saguiguilid, as indentured household servants. In modern times, it has been a norm among upper and upper-middle-class families in the Philippines to hire at least one maidservant-caretaker (katulong/kasambahay/yaya) to care for the household and children. Most, particularly maidservant-caretakers (katulong/kasambahay/yaya), live together in the house of their master's family with usually only a day off per month. This practice has eventually influenced the architecture of some houses or apartment condos where it has become a norm to section a room where domestic maidservants sleep as their personal room, usually near the kitchen or laundry area. Some wealthy families also section off an area or house where all the maidservants sleep or a part of the kitchen where they eat separate from the master's table. There are also employment agencies and special government laws regarding the regulation of domestic worker employment, such as the "Domestic Workers Act" or "Batas Kasambahay" in Republic Act No 10361. Many live underpaid since many are informally hired or salaries are not declared truthfully to government offices or have an agreement instead to pay through other means, such as paying for their education, pension, or to send money back to their families. This practice was eventually exported to neighboring countries and all other countries that overseas Filipino workers (OFWs) have worked in, such as the United States, Canada, Hong Kong, Singapore, China, Saudi Arabia, and other countries in the Middle East, etc., hence some maidservants continue living with the same mindset of how domestic worker culture was practiced in the Philippines. This has also, at times, been used as a cause to look down upon overseas Filipino workers (OFWs) in the countries where they can be found. It has sometimes created controversies in other countries such as abuse charges in several countries in the Middle East or like the case of Flor Contemplacion, who was executed in Singapore for murder allegations. There have also been documentaries or rom-com movies made in the Philippines about the plight or life of domestic workers, particularly maidservant-caretakers (katulong/kasambahay/yaya).

The Central Luzon Regional Tripartite Wages and Productivity Board approved Wage Order RBH-DW-O4 on March 4, 2024, "increasing the monthly wage rate of kasambahay by P1,000 in chartered cities and first class municipalities, and P1,500 in other municipalities, effectively bring the monthly minimum wage in the region to P6,000." The National Wages and Productivity Commission affirmed the Order on March 12, 2024, and will take effect on April 1, 2024.

==== Saudi Arabia ====
According to a 2008 report by Human Rights Watch (HRW), the Saudi Ministry of Labor provided official figures of 1.2 million household workers in Saudi Arabia including domestic workers, drivers, and gardeners. The report stated that the Gulf country employed nearly 1.5 million women domestic workers from Indonesia, Sri Lanka and Philippines. Domestic workers estimated approximately 600,000 from Indonesia, 275,000 from Sri Lanka and 200,000 from Philippines. However, HRW reported that a number of domestic workers in Saudi Arabia face a range of abuses. Besides, the organization also interviewed Saudi labor and social affairs official, who acknowledged the issue of domestic worker abuse. The report stated that no accurate figure exists to highlight the total violations of labor rights and other human rights that women migrant domestic workers confront in the Arab nation. Offense is building in East African countries over the number of deaths and abuses of their domestic workers in the Kingdom with Kenya reporting 274 deaths in the last five years and 55 deaths last year.

==== Singapore ====
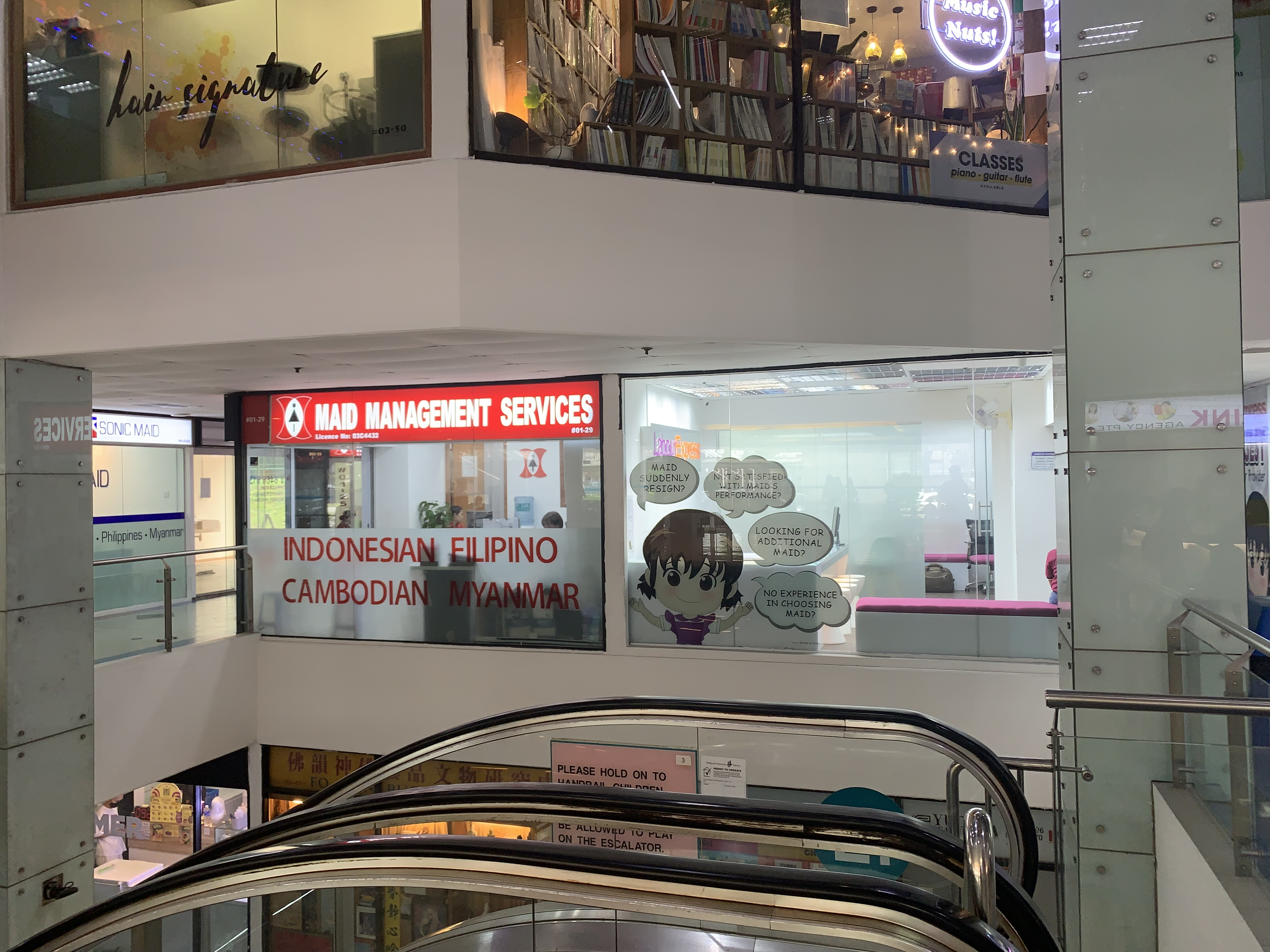
Domestic worker agencies at a shopping centre in Bukit Timah, Singapore

Data from Singapore's Ministry of Manpower (MOM), showed that in June 2019 there were some 255,800 Foreign Domestic Workers (FDW) in Singapore. The demand for Foreign Domestic Workers came about from the desire of the Singapore government to employ local women in the workforce. Starting with the Foreign Maid Scheme in 1978, Malaysia (with whom there were special immigration arrangements), Bangladesh, Burma, India, Indonesia, the Philippines, Sri Lanka and Thailand were recruiting grounds for domestic workers. Nearly 20% of Singapore household has a domestic worker which has been attributed to rising wealth, parents who both work as well as the ageing population. As of 2019, MOM require that employers of FDWs must purchase them medical insurance with a minimum coverage of S$15,000 per year.

Domestic worker in Singapore are susceptible to trafficking when traveling to Singapore for employment within the entertainment industry. Over the years there have also been an abundance of instances of employer abuse of domestic workers, an industry that is dominated by migrant workers so much so that in September 2014, the Burmese government prohibited the legal migration of Burmese citizens to Singapore to do domestic work due to concerns over working conditions.

==== Vietnam ====
On December 14, the Government of Vietnam issued Decree No. 145/2020 / ND-CP about the Labor Code regarding working conditions and labor relations. Including detailed provisions and guidance for the implementation of Clause 2, Article 161 of the Labor Code regarding domestic worker labor. This Decree details and guides the implementation of a number of contents on labor conditions and labor relations in accordance with the following articles and clauses of the Labor Code: Labor management; Labor contract; Labor outsourcing; Organize dialogue and implement grassroots democracy at work; Salary; Working time, rest time; Labor discipline, material responsibility; Insurance for the domestic worker; Female labor and gender equality; Labor is the housekeeper; Settlement of labor disputes.

=== Europe ===
==== United Kingdom ====
The United Kingdom English country houses and great houses employed many live-in domestic workers with distinctive roles and chain of command. The lord of the manor would hire a butler to oversee the servants. Manorialism dates back to the Middle Ages and slowly died out. The British historical drama television series Downton Abbey portrayed these roles. The wealthy in the city would also have domestic workers, but fewer and with less distinctive roles. Domestic workers were mostly considered part of the lower class and some middle class.

In modern times, migrant domestic workers have been brought in to the UK to fill the demand for low-cost workers. Human rights groups have added that they are often subject to abuse.

=== North America ===
==== Canada ====
Domestic helpers in Canada, mainly from the Philippines, work in Canada, including under the Live-In Caregiver program.

==== United States ====
===== Black Americans post-Civil War to World War I =====
In the United States, slavery legally ended in 1865, however, the Freedmen's Bureau informed the former slaves now classified as freedmen and women that they could either sign labor contracts with white planters or be evicted from the land that they had lived on. Most freedmen in the South signed labor contracts with their former white slave owners because that was the only work experience they had. With limited skills and illiteracy, many men turned to become sharecroppers, whereas the majority of women participated in domestic work. Not only were they not qualified for other jobs, but they were denied other jobs and segregated from American society purely based on the color of their skin. The South wanted to keep segregation alive and hence passed legislation such as the Jim Crow Laws post-Civil war which denied African Americans of legal equality and political rights. These laws kept many African Americans as a second-class status up until new laws ended segregation in the 1960s.

Up until the mid-twentieth century, domestic work was a prominent source of income for many women of different ethnic backgrounds. Many of these women were either African American or immigrants. More specifically, the post-civil war South had a high concentration of African Americans working as domestic workers. At the turn of the nineteenth century, there was also a high concentration of African Americans working as domestic workers in the North. Many African American women migrated to the North for better work opportunities and higher wages compared to their employment options in the South. The African American women who worked as domestic workers were generally treated as poor, childlike beings that were seen as victims of their own ignorance of living in communities of crime and other societal infringements. However, despite the stereotypes labeled upon domestic workers, these women still settled for these positions because the only occupations that were open to African American women before World War I were domestic services. It was necessary they worked along with their husbands in order to keep their families financially supported.

Frequently underpaid, African American servants commonly took food scraps and discarded clothing from their employers in a practice known as "pan toting" or the "service pan". The service pan augmented wages in almost two-thirds of the employers' households in Athens, Georgia, in 1913. The pan system was used by employers to justify paying a lower wage, and used by domestic workers to counter their employers' dishonesty. Whites also pointed to the practice of pan toting as proof that "a Negro could not help but steal", thereby reinforcing stereotypes of "black inferiority and dependency" and rationalizing racist paternalism.

===== Black Americans in the Great Depression =====
Due to the Great Depression, many domestic workers lost their jobs. This is because many white families lost their source of income and were not able to pay domestic workers to work in their home. At this time, many domestic workers relied on asking strangers on the street for housework such as cleaning. They house jumped, looking for any job that they could get. The domestic workforce was significantly impacted by the Great Depression which caused a decrease in their wages and an intolerable 18 hour workday. Also, agricultural workers and the African American women working as domestic workers at this time were explicitly excluded from Social Security and the Fair Labor Standards Act in the New Deal legislation; domestic workers of all races were excluded from Social Security until 1950. (Household employees working at least two days a week for the same person were added to Social Security coverage in 1950, along with nonprofit workers and the self-employed. Hotel workers, laundry workers, all agricultural workers, and state and local government employees were added in 1954.) This is because the New Dealer politicians were more worried about losing support from the Southern Democrats in Congress who supported segregation rather than refusing coverage for many African Americans. Unlike their white counterparts, African Americans did not form labor unions because they lacked the resources, consciousness, and the access to networks used for union recruiting. On top of that, the domestic workers would not typically have earned enough money to be able to afford being a part of a union. Even if the African American domestic workers wanted to advance in society, it was nearly impossible because the racial structures in the United States rarely allowed them class mobility. However, domestic workers that were white such as the Irish and the Germans utilized working in middle-class homes to their advantage. Working in the middle-class homes served to Americanize, allowing the workers to identify more with their employers than women of their own class and instilled an aspiration to become middle-class status.

===== Black Americans in 1960s United States =====
Nearly ninety percent of Southern African American women worked as domestic workers during the Civil Rights Movement era. Their participation in the Civil Rights Movement went fairly undocumented. Despite their low-status career in the United States, they were beneficial for the betterment of society and the status of the African American race. It has been noted that the southern African American women were the backbone of the Civil Rights Movement.

Since many white households relied on the African American domestic workers for housework, the workers were able to have a direct impact on the white race when rebelling for their civil rights. The African American domestic workers boycotted buses and tried to register to vote, and many were denied and imprisoned. However, the domestic workers utilized imprisonment to educate other African American women on the Civil Rights Movement and what to do to contribute. Additionally, the domestic workers frequently rebelled in an informal manner, such as resisting to live in the same home in which they worked. By doing this, the African American domestic workers transformed the domestic services, and collective organizations came about promoting a better work environment for African American domestic workers. Their act of rebellion gave way for a change of how they were treated, how they were paid, and how they were respected.

== Varieties of domestic workers ==
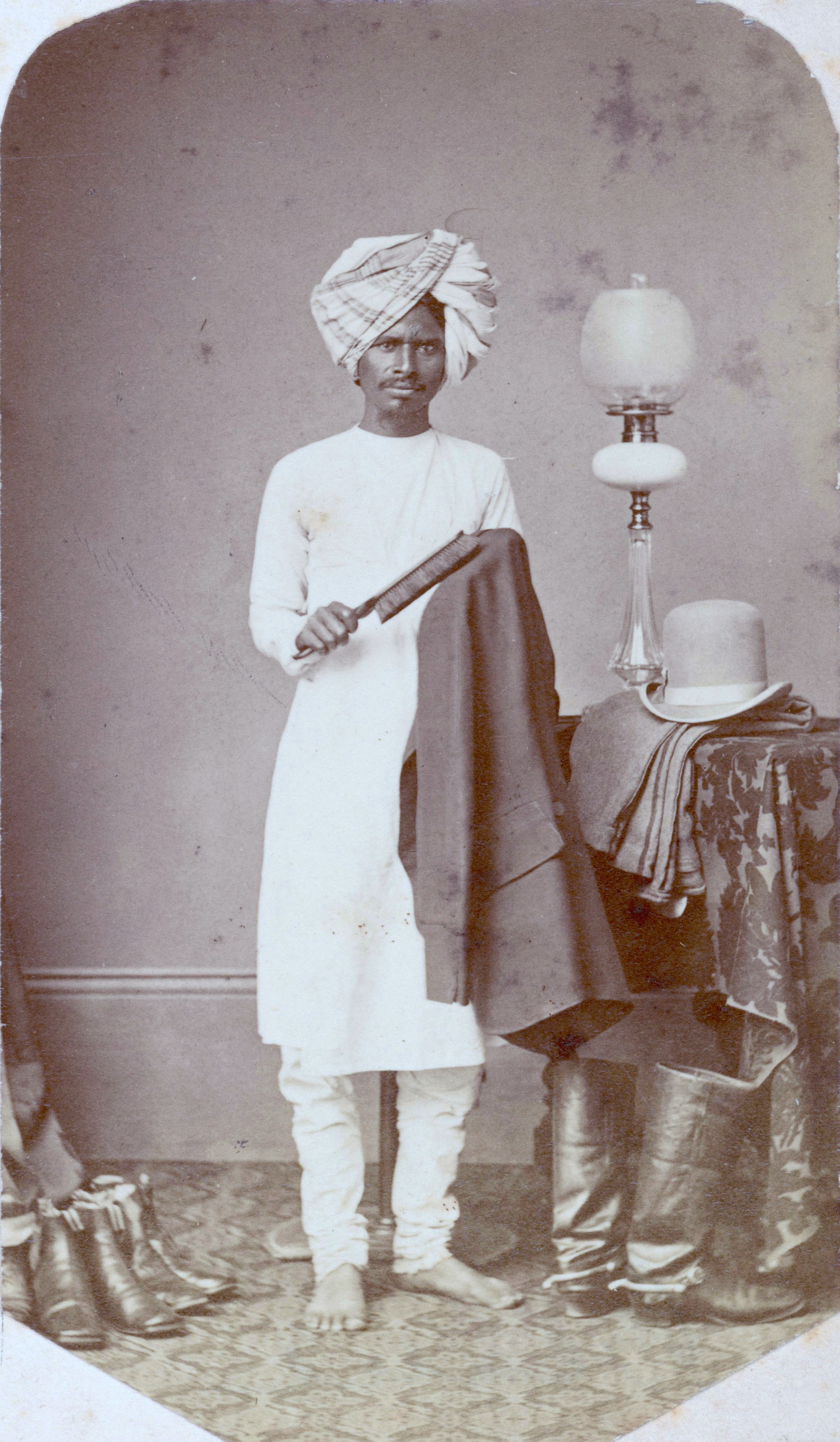
A valet in India, c. 1870

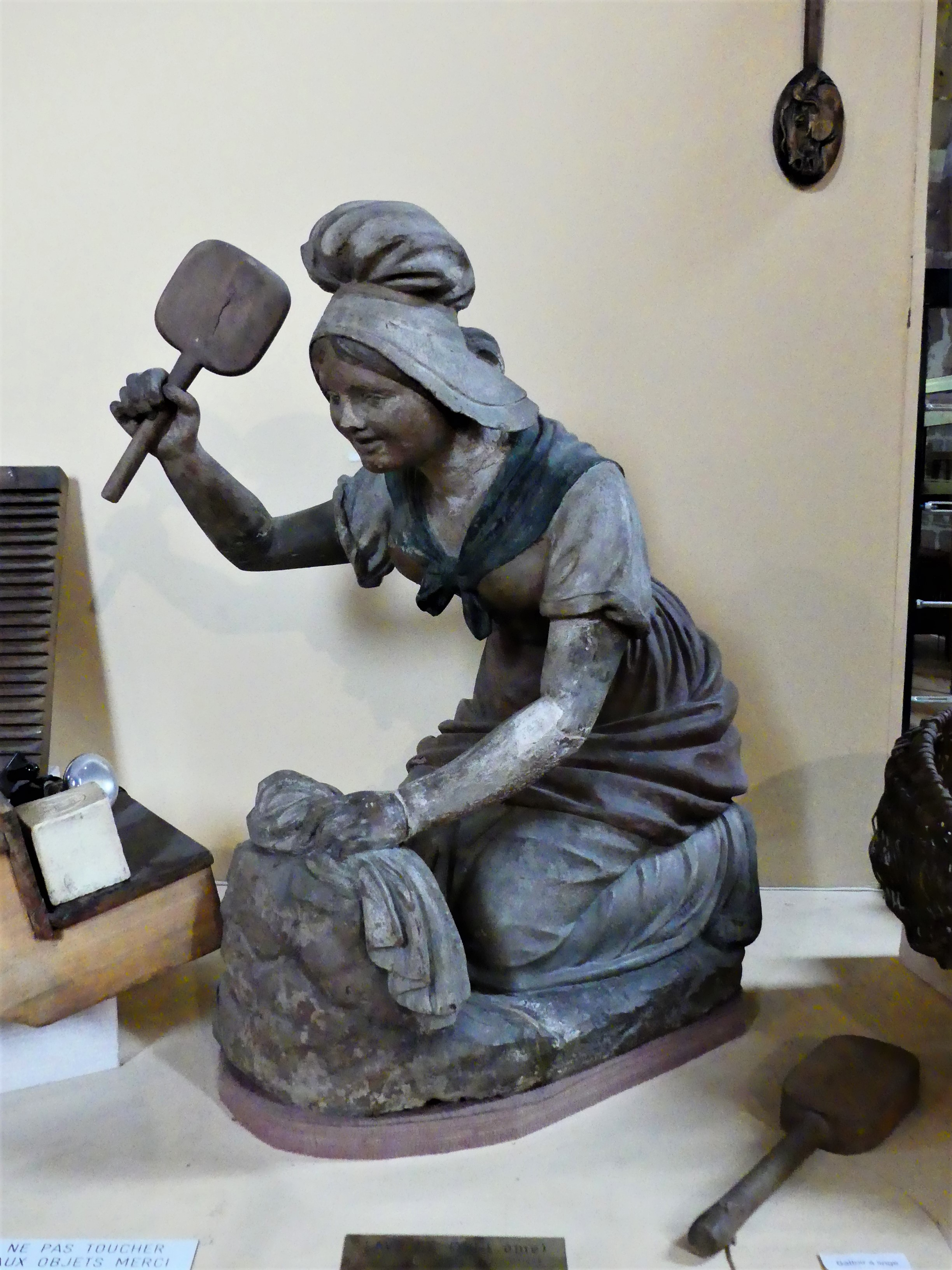
A terracotta statue of a washerwoman (18th century)

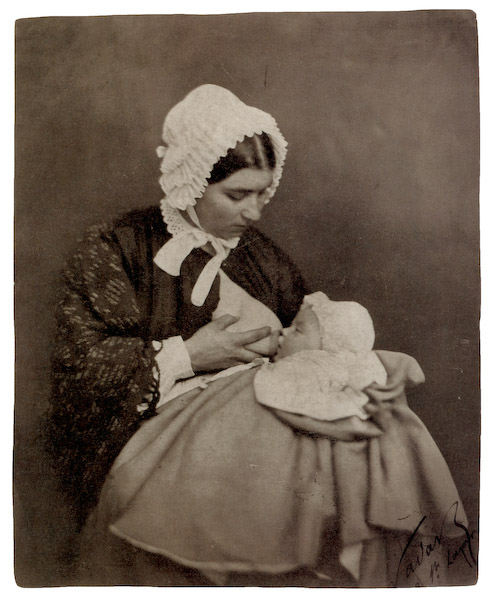
A French wet nurse

The following is a list of known domestic workers:

- Au pair – A foreign-national domestic assistant working for and living as part of, a host family.
- Amanuensis – A person employed to write or type what another dictates or to copy what has been written by another.
- Ayah – A job that is similar to a nanny's. Mostly found in South and Southeast Asia.
- Babysitter – A worker who minds the children of someone else.
- Bedder / bedmaker – A worker who rearranges and organizes bedding to prepare it for later use.
- Between maid – An in-between maid whose duties are half in the reception rooms and half in the kitchen.
- Boot boy – A young male servant, employed mostly to perform footwear maintenance and minor auxiliary tasks.
- Butler – A senior employee usually found in larger households, traditionally a man, whose duties customarily include overseeing the wine cellar, the silverware and some oversight of the other, usually male, servants.
- Casual staff - Part-time extra external worker.
- Chambermaid – A maid whose chief focus is on cleaning and maintaining bedrooms, ensuring fires are lit in fireplaces when needed, and supplying hot water.
- Charwoman (Char or Saturday's woman) – A female house or office cleaner, usually part-time.
- Chauffeur – A personal driver (for motor vehicles).
- Cleaner – A worker who cleans homes, institutions or commercial premises.
- Coachman - Drives horse carriage and in charge of the stables.
- Cook – This is either a cook who works alone or the head of a team of cooks who work for their employer. In South Asia khansamah is a term for a cook (or sometimes a steward).
- Dairymaid - Hand milks the animals, makes butter and other dairy products.
- Dog walker – A worker who walks dogs.
- Footman – A lower-ranking manservant.
- Game keeper - Care and maintaining the bird and deer population on a large estate.
- Gardener – A worker who tends to the garden.
- Gatekeeper - Job of guarding the main entrance to the estate.
- Groundskeeper – A worker who tends to the person's large property.
- Hall boy – The lowest ranking male servant who is usually found only in large households.
- Handyman – A worker who handles household repairs.
- Head Gardener in charge of all gardening.
- Horse trainer – A worker who trains the horses for those who own them.
- Houseboy – A worker who does personal chores.
- Housekeeper – A housekeeper usually denotes a female senior employee.
- Kitchen maid – A worker who works for the cook.
- Lackey – A runner who may be overworked and underpaid.
- Lady's maid – A woman's personal attendant, helping her with her clothes, shoes, accessories, hair, and cosmetics.
- Lady-in-waiting - Royal Lady's maid
- Laundress – A laundry servant.
- Maid (Housemaid) – Female servants who perform typical domestic tasks.
- Majordomo – The senior-most staff member of a very large household or stately home. See also Seneschal.
- Masseur/Masseuse – A servant who performs massages.
- Nanny (children's Nurse) – A woman who takes care of infants and children.
- Nursemaid (Nursery maid) – A maid who oversees the nursery.
- Page or Tea boy - An Apprentice footman, 10 to 16 years old.
- Parlour maid - Cleaning the sitting rooms, drawing rooms, library and alike.
- Personal shopper – A person who does the shopping.
- Personal trainer – A worker who trains their employer in fitness, swimming, and sports.
- Porter - Like a hall boy, but older with added building security duties.
- Pool person – A worker who works by the swimming pool.
- Postilion - Rode the left horse if there was no coachman.
- Retainer (Retinue and Affinity) – A servant, especially one who has been with one family for a long time (chiefly British English).
- Scullery maid – The lowest-ranking of the domestic workers who act as assistants to the kitchen maid.
- Stable boy or Groom – A worker who handles the management of the horses and the stables.
- Stable Master - Responsible for running the stables.
- Steward - A domestic worker who oversees the supervisions of servants, the collection of the rents, and keeps the accounts of anything.
  - Kitchen steward - A type of steward that keeps an eye on the kitchen by having it cleaned and maintained.
- Storeroom maid - Maintaining the stores of linens, foodstuffs, pantry and household supplies.
- Valet – Known as the "gentleman's gentleman", a valet is responsible for the master's wardrobe and assisting him in dressing, shaving, etc. In the armed forces, some officers have a soldier (in the British army called a batman) for such duties.
- Wet nurse – A nurse who provides suckling for infants if mothers cannot or do not wish to do so themselves.

There are other professions that work and may live in the household, but are not considered domestic workers, as they would not be housed with the domestic staff. Professions like: Tutor or Governess, secretary, librarian, private chaplains, physician, personal trainer, and Lady's companion.

== Notable workers ==
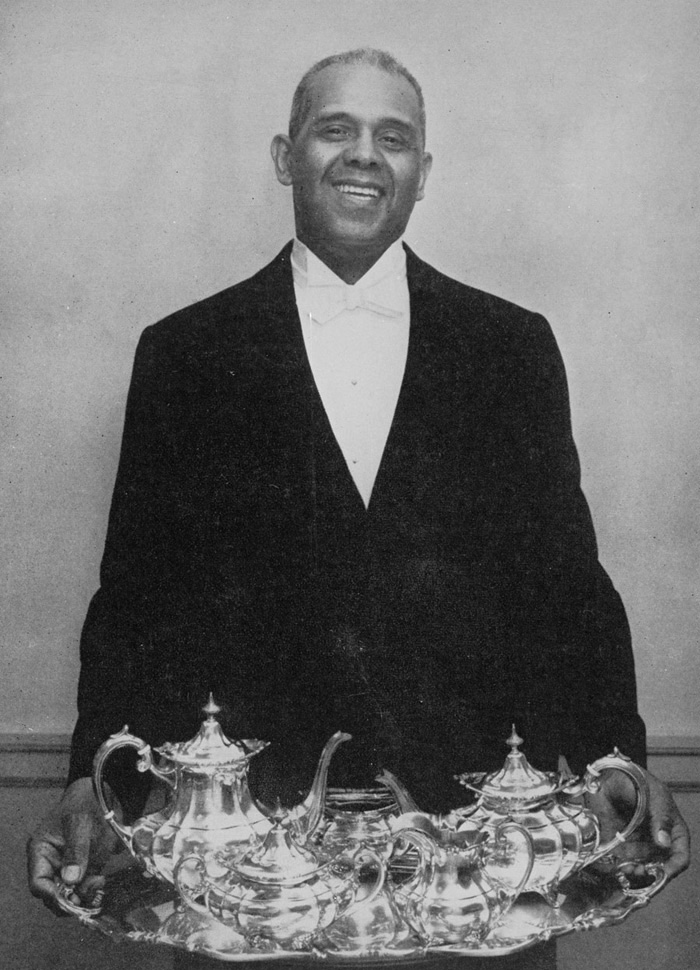
Alonzo Fields, butler at the White House

Some domestic workers have become notable, including: Abdul Karim (the Munshi), servant of Queen Victoria of the United Kingdom; Paul Burrell, butler to Diana, Princess of Wales; Moa Martinson, author of proletarian literature, kitchen maid; and Charles Spence, Scottish poet, stonemason and footman.

== Cultural depictions ==
=== In religion ===
- Category:Canonised servants of the Romanov household
- Saint Blath of Kildare, the patron saint of cooks
- Saint Zita, the patron saint of domestic servants

=== In fiction ===
- A Little Princess, a book made into several films
- Alfred Pennyworth, Bruce Wayne's faithful butler, created by Bob Kane and Bill Finger
- Amelia Bedelia, children's comedy fiction
- Beryl's Lot, a British television series based on Margaret Powell's memoirs of domestic service
- Cinderella, a fairytale, cartoon, and film
- The Diary of a Chambermaid, a novel by Octave Mirbeau
- Downton Abbey, a British television series set in a large English country house
- Edwin Jarvis, the butler of Tony Stark
- Esther Waters, a novel by George Moore
- Gone with the Wind, a Pulitzer Prize-winning American novel and Academy Award-winning film
- The Help, a novel by Kathryn Stockett
- The Remains of the Day, Booker Prize–winning novel
- Upstairs, Downstairs, a British television series set in London
- Upstairs Downstairs (remake), a British television series set in London
- You Rang, M'Lord?, a British television comedy series

=== In visual art ===
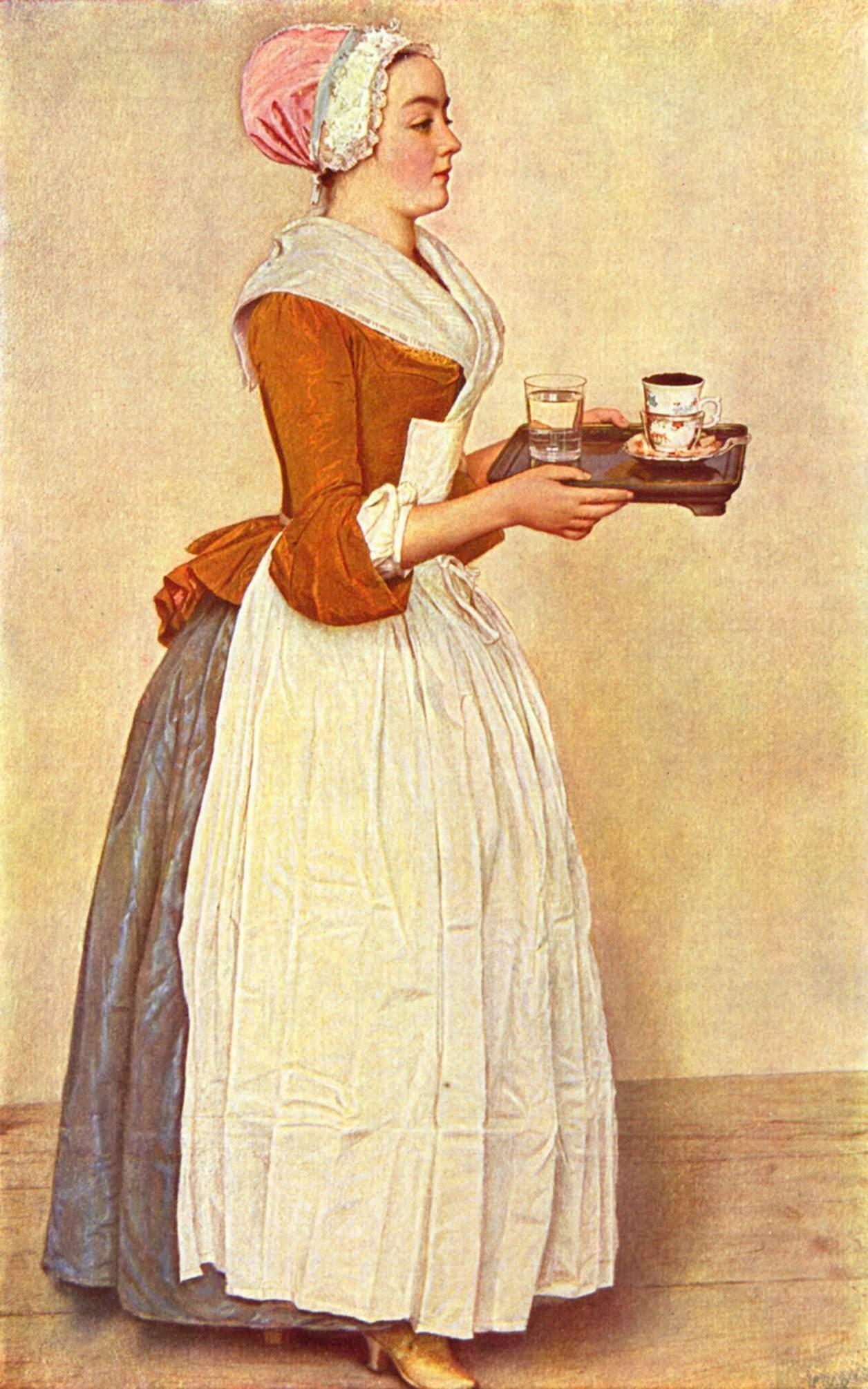
The Chocolate Girl, by Jean-Étienne Liotard (c. 1734–1744)

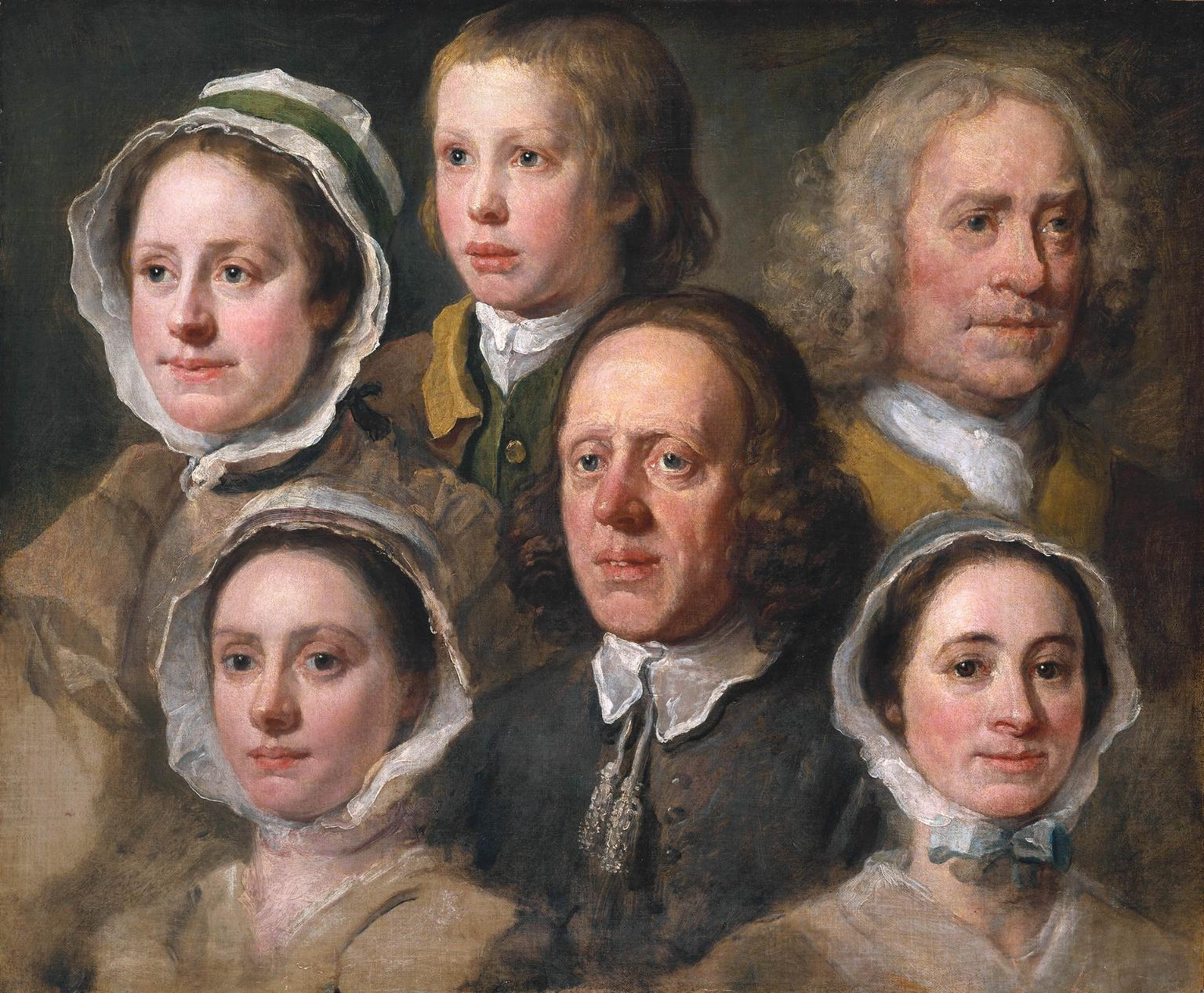
Hogarth's Servants (William Hogarth, 1750s)

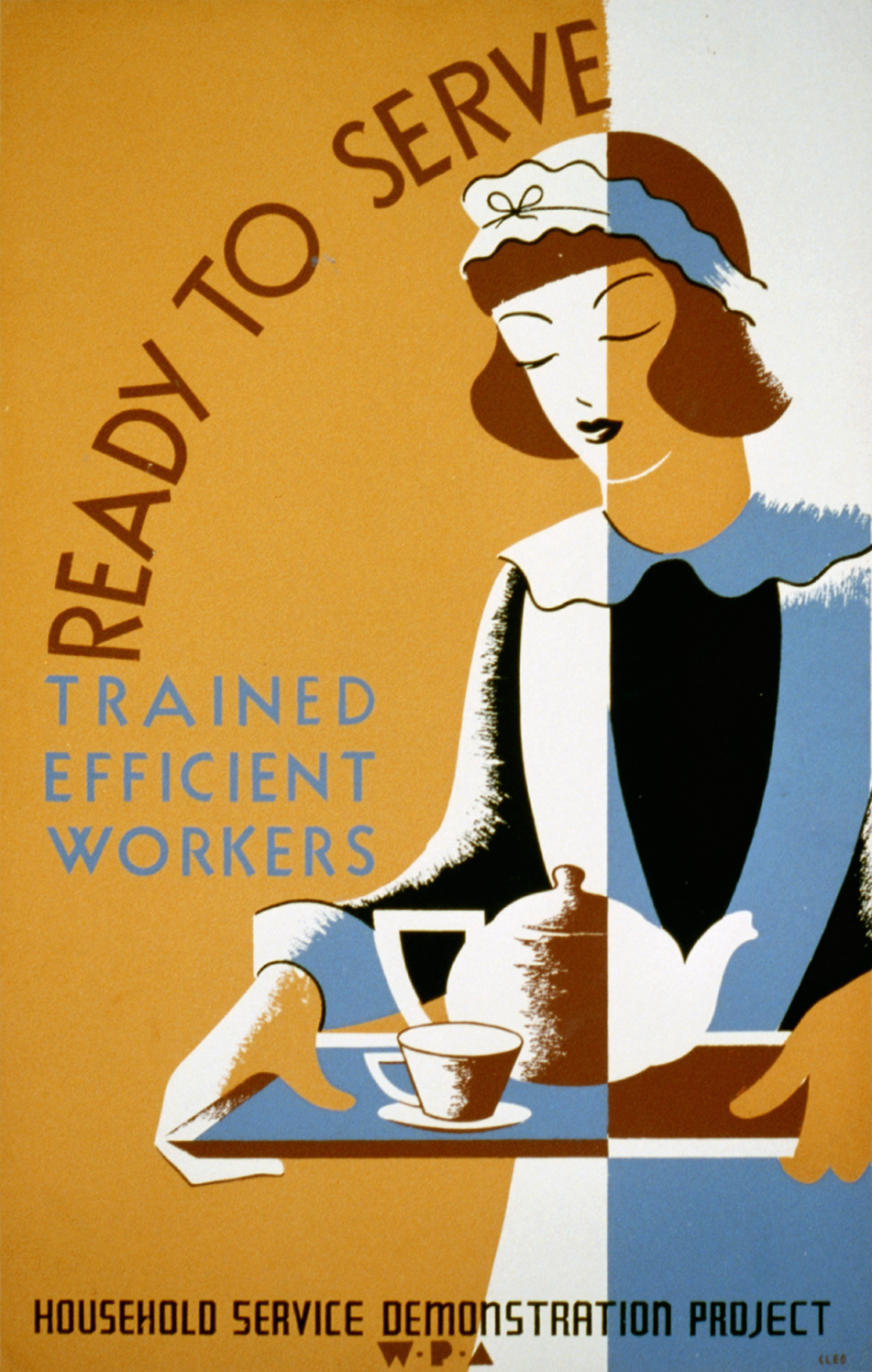
A poster of an American maid in uniform (ca. 1939)

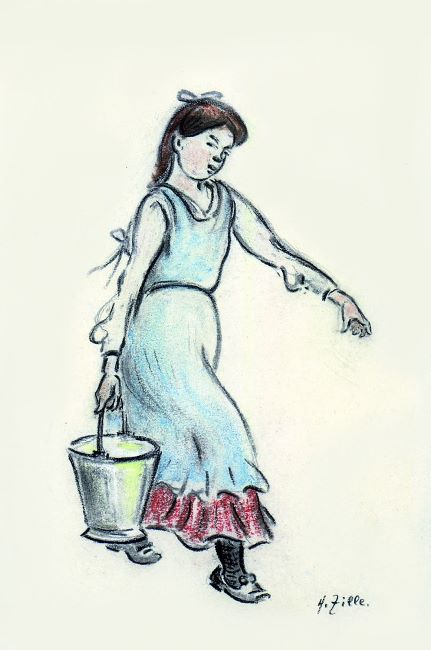
Young water carrier drawing by Heinrich Zille (by 1929)

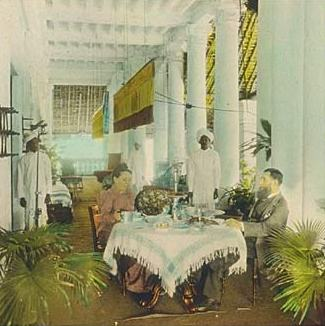
Colonial dining, William Henry Jackson (1895)

== See also ==
- Women workers
  - French maid, 19th and 20th-century term for lady's maid of French nationality
  - Handmaiden, female servant
  - Homemaking, management of home
  - Hooch maid, South Vietnamese maid employed for American servicemen during the Vietnam War
  - Housekeeping, cleaning and running a house
  - Maid, female servant
  - The Maid Narratives
  - Reproductive labor, female servant who provides services related to the childbirth
  - Isabella Beeton, the author of The Book of Household Management
- Abuse and exploitation of domestic workers
  - Maid abuse
  - Ancillae, female house slaves in ancient Rome,
  - Slavery in Christianity
  - Forced labour
  - History of slavery
  - Slavery in Islam
  - Human trafficking
  - Kafala system, Islamic system of slavish bonded labour

== Rights and laws for protection of domestic workers ==
  - Barbados Servant Code
  - Convention on Domestic Workers
  - Domestic Worker's Bill of Rights
  - Geraldine Roberts, American domestic worker who founded first domestic right's organisation
  - National Union of Domestic Employees
  - Nanny tax, American system for protecting the rights of domestic workers and employers
