= Human trafficking in Singapore =

Singapore ratified the 2000 UN TIP Protocol in September 2015.

According to the U.S. Government's Trafficking in Person's (TIP) Report, in 2021 Singapore was a destination country for foreign victims trafficked for the purpose of labor and commercial sexual exploitation. Over the years, victims of trafficking in Singapore have come from many countries throughout Asia such as India, Thailand, the People's Republic of China, Sri Lanka, Bangladesh, the Philippines, Cambodia, Vietnam, Burma and Malaysia. Many of these people travel to Singapore voluntarily for work in different industries such as construction, manufacturing, or commercial sex. The use of deception about working conditions, debt bondage, the unlawful confiscation of travel documents, confinement and/or physical or sexual abuse is utilized by traffickers to force victims into involuntary servitude. The U.S. TIP Report also notes a small quantity of Singaporeans engaging in and/or promoting child sex tourism abroad.

The U.S. State Department's Office to Monitor and Combat Trafficking in Persons placed the country in Tier 1 in 2020 and 2023.

== Prevalence ==
The Tier 1 ranking of Singapore in the 2020 and subsequent 2021 U.S. TIP Reports denotes the Singaporean government's compliance with international standards to reduce and prevent human trafficking in the country. This ranking means that the Singaporean government sufficiently complies with the Trafficking Victims Protection Act (TVPA) of 2000's minimum standards. With the first TIP Report being done in the year 2001, Singapore's progress has been tracked over the past 20 years and human trafficking in the country remains a prevalent activity in many forms. Although sex trafficking often takes center stage in conversations around human trafficking activities in Singapore, labor trafficking is a widespread issue in the country. However, due to years of ineffective systems of victim identification, those who may have displayed indicators of being victim to labor trafficking were not handled as such. This resulted in many labor offenses being investigated under the country's Employment of Foreign Manpower Act (EFMA) rather than their Prevention of Human Trafficking Act (PHTA) that was passed on March 1, 2015. Victims of sex trafficking face some of the same hurdles as victims of labor trafficking when it comes to identification and proper investigation of their cases. The frequent use of repatriation companies by abusive employers has meant that many victims do not get the chance to find retribution within the legal system of Singapore. These companies are called upon by guilty employers to force repatriation on trafficking victims seeking legal redress. As noted in the U.S. TIP Reports, there also exists a small presence of Singaporean citizens taking part in child sex tourism abroad whether as consumers or facilitators.

== Types of trafficking ==
Both labor and sex trafficking occur in different forms within Singapore. As noted in all of the U.S. TIP Reports, many of those who fall victim to trafficking are initially voluntary migrants to Singapore for work opportunities in the many different industries in the country. However, upon arrival and locating jobs, deception by employers regarding working conditions and the use of other coercive strategies lead to conditions that would constitute trafficking. These other coercive strategies can include, but are not limited to, debt bondage, the illegal withholding of employees’ travel documents and pay, and the restriction of employees’ movement by way of intimidation and/or physical abuse. Agencies that are responsible for recruiting employees can also play a role as some take part in imposing fees on workers over the legalized maximum amounts and also the unlawful practice of contract switching.

=== Labor trafficking ===
Singapore relies on the labor of foreign migrant workers to aid in running its many industries. However, according to the 2021 U.S. TIP Report on Singapore, “Some of the 848,200 foreign work permit holders who comprise almost one-quarter of Singapore’s labor force are at risk of trafficking.” The abuses of workers can begin before they leave their home country. Contracts that are entered into abroad or the payment of exorbitant fees to recruitment agencies at home make foreign workers susceptible to trafficking through misrepresentation of working conditions and debt bondage. These issues also occur once workers arrive in Singapore. There have been documented cases of abuse of the work permit sponsorship system in Singapore that gives employers undue power over the legal status of migrant workers as well as the ability to “the ability to repatriate workers legally at any time during their contracts with minimal notice.” There is little distinction between industries when it comes to the possibility of trafficking.

Women migrant workers in Singapore are susceptible to trafficking when traveling to Singapore for employment within the entertainment industry. In the 2011 U.S. TIP Report there was a noted increase in reporting of victims experiencing forced labor on long-haul fishing boats that dock in Singapore. Over the years there have also been an abundance of instances of employer abuse of domestic workers, an industry that is dominated by migrant workers So much so that in September 2014, the Burmese government prohibited the legal migration of Burmese citizens to Singapore to do domestic work due to concerns over working conditions. The Singaporean government's efforts to address this problem have improved over the years. Under the PHTA, the government made their first labor trafficking conviction in late 2019.

=== Sex trafficking ===
With prostitution being legal in Singapore, many foreign women are attracted to the country to participate in the commercial sex industry. It is not an uncommon occurrence that women voluntarily travel to Singapore to participate in this regulated labor sector. However, through the same forms of coercion used by labor traffickers, women can fall victim to sex trafficking. The operation of brothels is permitted in Singapore and these can be sites for trafficking activities that leave victims hidden in plain sight. In the 2004 U.S. TIP Report it was noted that the estimated number of girls and women trafficked for the purposes of sexual exploitation is small but greater than 100 annually. This is the same year that it was indicated that Singapore has a significant trafficking problem. In 2008, in an effort to curb prostitution in the country, law enforcement arrested many foreign women without taking the steps to properly identify possible victims of trafficking. Another issue within the larger problem of sex trafficking in the country is the illegal solicitation of sex from minors. It was not until this same year that Singapore outlawed prostitution of 16 and 17 year olds. In 2018, the country crafted a set of victim identification standard operating procedures to more effectively detect victims of trafficking. In the 2016 U.S. TIP Report, it was noted that child sex trafficking of both foreign and domestic children is confirmed to be occurring in Singapore. However, there have also been instances of Singaporean men participating in child sex tourism abroad, including in the neighboring Batam, Indonesia. The U.S. TIP Reports recommend that the Singaporean government prioritizes addressing child sex tourism by Singaporeans in foreign territories.

== Governmental efforts ==
Since the very first TIP Report done by the U.S. government, Singapore has been ranked as Tier 1, Tier 2, and Tier 2 Watchlist over the years. These rankings are dependent on the governmental efforts occurring in the country to prevent and reduce the prevalence of trafficking. In 2001 and 2002, the country was listed as Tier 2 as the country did not meet the minimum standards for the elimination of trafficking but was seen making significant efforts to do so. The country was notably absent from the 2003 TIP report, however returning in 2004 it continued to be ranked as Tier 2 until the year 2006. In 2006, Singapore was upgraded to a Tier 1 country that now met all the minimum standards. This ranking then fell the following year and remained at Tier 2 until 2010 when the country was ranked as Tier 2 Watchlist. This is the lowest ranking the country has had since the TIP report began and this was attributed to a rise in the prevalence of trafficking in the country with an absence of increased efforts from the government of Singapore to either prevent or curb these activities. From 2011 to 2020 the country stayed at a Tier 2 ranking for its efforts. The newly achieved Tier 1 ranking is based on the evaluation of three areas of governmental efforts: prosecution, protection, and prevention.

=== Prosecution ===
The U.S. government's TIP Report aids in creating a timeline of how governmental efforts to address and prevent human trafficking in Singapore have developed over the years. Beginning in 2001, the Singaporean government was recognized as Tier 2 for their efforts at discouraging trafficking. These efforts involved mostly taking human trafficking related measures such as the tightening of immigration laws and the aggregation of charges for sentencing rather than instating direct human trafficking laws. Through 2002 governmental efforts in terms of prosecution had not changed much, however by the year 2004 the Singaporean government recognized that human trafficking was an issue within the country but did not extend that recognition to sex trafficking. At this time there was no national action plan to combat trafficking. This remained true in 2005 as there was still a lack of an overall trafficking law in the country. However, all activities that fall under the umbrella of trafficking as noted by the United Nations (UN) were outlawed in Singapore at this time. The 2005 TIP Report also notes that there is not and has not been any evidence present to suggest that the government is complicit in trafficking. By 2006, the country was upgraded to Tier 1 and this is shown in their upgraded governmental efforts. Legislation was put into motion to criminalize child sex tourism participated in abroad by Singaporeans as well as the prostitution of 16 and 17 year-olds within the country. More examples of prosecution against those exploiting others for sexual or labor purposes was also present in this year's report. However, in 2007 the country of Singapore was downgraded back to not meeting the minimum standards for the elimination of trafficking and is thus ranked as Tier 2. While they are acknowledged as making strides to do so, the legislation put into motion was not approved and so recommendations were given to prioritize these two issues. In 2008 further recommendations were given that pertain to the further prosecution of offenders and avoiding the incarceration of victims of trafficking by being more proactive about identifying victims of trafficking that may be arrested for illicit activities such as prostitution. During this reporting period, “There were no reported criminal prosecutions or convictions for labor or sex trafficking offenses.” In 2009 the report acknowledged that progress had been made in combating trafficking over the years but also noted that the government of Singapore had a responsibility to increase its efforts in identifying, investigating, and prosecuting cases of trafficking in persons. During the year 2012, the U.S. TIP Report reported that the Singaporean government had crafted and publicly released a National Plan of Action. The report for this year consisted mainly of recommendations that would rectify the need to bring Singapore's laws into compliance with that of international standards. In 2013, it was reported that in the year of 2012 amendments to the EFMA had been enacted. Recommendations for this year consisted of calling for the implementation of key operational definitions for the purposes of policy-making and prosecution in this realm and improvements on governmental reactions to trafficking in all areas (prosecution, protection, and prevention). Victim-centered approaches were also recommended at this time as well as the Singaporean government to accede to the 2000 UN TIP Protocol. The 2014 U.S. TIP Report gave nearly identical recommendations as the year prior and included a suggestion to enact a law that outlaws all forms of trafficking. Prosecution efforts were noted as remaining minimal or modest for this reporting period. The country's first anti-trafficking law that outlaws all forms of human trafficking within the country is passed in the year 2015. The Prevention of Human Trafficking Act which took effect on 1 March 2015 makes all forms of human trafficking illegal and has penalties of up to 10 years in jail, fines up to 100,000 Singaporean dollars and caning up to 6 strokes. Some other consequences include even more fines along with the initial fine of trafficking. As the first case of imprisonment under the Act, Muhammad Khairulanwar bin Rohmat, a 25-year-old final-year student at the Singapore Institute of Management (SIM), was found guilty and sentenced on 19 February 2016 of four charges of recruiting a child for sexual exploitation, receiving payment from this exploitation, and sexual penetration of a minor, alongside 14 charges that were taken into consideration. He was sentenced to six years and three months’ jail and fined S$30,000. However, by the year 2018 most labor offenses were still being prosecuted under EFMA instead of PHTA which gave lesser penalties to offenders. The 2019 U.S. TIP Report included prioritized recommendations that include: increasing resources for prosecution of offenders and victim identification, proactive victim identification, providing of legal alternatives to deportation for migrant workers who may face hardships in their origin countries, and reform of the work permit sponsorship system to counteract unfair power dynamics being taken advantage of by abusive employers. This year it was also noted that the Singaporean government increased its efforts in the realm of prosecution. As noted in the 2020 U.S. TIP Report, there was an increase in the identification of victims of trafficking as well as an increase in cooperation with local NGOs shown in over two dozen meetings between NGOs and the government. Law enforcement also increased prosecution efforts for this reporting period with participation in workshops on victim identification and collaboration with the government for their victim referral process. As compared to previous years, many more cases of both sex and labor trafficking were also investigated during this reporting period. In the 2021 U.S. TIP Report it was reported that local NGOs still felt as though “authorities set unreasonably high standards for crimes to qualify as trafficking and lacked an understanding of trafficking indicators such as indebtedness, psychological coercion, and deception, which continued to hamper proper victim identification.” However, according to governmental reports, more than 440 officials in the country were still being trained on measures related to anti-trafficking and victim identification. International training also occurred to facilitate collaboration with foreign governments on cross-border investigations. Action was also taken by authorities against those accused of using excessive force when arresting individuals participating in commercial sex during police raids of brothels without the proper licensing.

=== Protection ===
Governmental efforts in the protection of victims of trafficking have also been tracked over the years through the U.S. TIP Reports. Beginning in 2001, the Singaporean government was not providing any help for victims of sex trafficking. The same was true of non-governmental organizations (NGOs) in the country. In a move toward more governmental efforts toward protection, in 2002, it was noted that the government was participating in “regional initiatives against transnational crime, which include enhanced efforts against trafficking in persons.” In 2004, it was detailed that Singapore had created an office dedicated to the protection of foreign domestic workers within its Ministry of Manpower (MOM). This office also worked to “educate employees and employers on acceptable employment practices.” Subsequently, in 2005, there was a crackdown on employer abuse of foreign domestic workers. Following this, in 2006, the Singaporean government was recognized as providing adequate assistance to victims of trafficking in the country. By 2007, the MOM was providing resources for victims of employer abuse or the harms of sex trafficking but this did not last for long. In 2008, the U.S. TIP Report details that the government of Singapore made no notable progress in the protection of victims in this reporting period and the same was noted in the 2009 report. In 2014, protection efforts were recognized as remaining minimal or modest and in 2015 victim identification was deemed still ineffective. However, the 2016 report notes that the country did accede to the 2000 UN TIP Protocol in September 2015. Issues with effective victim identification persist into the year 2017 but by 2018, law enforcement and government agencies were working to train employees on different aspects of trafficking such as trauma of sex trafficked persons and victim identification. Protection efforts increased in the country and law enforcement and government now had standard operating procedures for victim identification. Recommendations for this year now called for greater aid to and cooperation with NGOs. In 2019, protection efforts were acknowledged as continuing to increase. The Singaporean Government also follows the Trafficking Victims Protection Act, which works with other pre-existing trafficking laws and makes benefits available to victims of trafficking. Some of these laws are the Women's Charter, Children and Young Persons' Act, and the Penal code. The Women's Charter is an act "to provide for monogamous marriages and for the solemnization and registration of such marriages; to amend and consolidate the law relating to divorce, the rights and duties of married persons, the protection of family, the maintenance of wives and children and the punishment of offences against women and girls; and to provide for matters incidental thereto". The Children and Young Persons' Act protects the welfare, care and protection of children and young persons by making homes safe and any other laws protecting children and young persons are consolidated within this act. In the 2020 reporting period, many more potential trafficking victims were identified and NGOs continued to provide services to victims although it was noted that these organizations felt that victim identification efforts by law enforcement were still ineffective. This issue in victim identification caused by law enforcement failing to detect certain indicators reportedly led to victims of trafficking being punished for activities that were the direct result of their victimization. However, the PHTA ensures victims access to food, psychosocial services, and shelter among other things as provided by the government. In 2019, the government allocated 406,000 SGD (US$300,000) of their annual budget to the care and protection of victims and anti-trafficking activities. The Ministry of Social and Family Development funded four NGO-run shelters while the government issued special immigration visas allowing for the stay of foreign victims during investigations and court proceedings. It was in this same year that the MOM started enforcing a new work permit policy that no longer allowed for employers to withhold the wages of domestic workers. Reforms were also made to the recruitment system that was host to employer and recruiter manipulation of foreign workers by imposing high fees on them that increased the risk of debt bondage. This new regulation was done by Singapore's Employment Agency Act (EAA). In the 2021 reporting period, it was noted that according to government reports, approximately 156,000 SGD (US$118,000) was spent in efforts to care for and support victims of trafficking. This was a 48,000 SGD (US$35,247) increase from the previous year. Despite this however, according to a report done by an NGO “contrary to current policy, which would allow a foreign victim to apply for new employment and a work permit after the proceedings are over, authorities most likely required foreign victims to leave the country in practice.”

=== Prevention ===
Another key element to governmental efforts surrounding combating human trafficking are prevention efforts. In Singapore, prevention efforts did not start to take shape until the year 2005 when they substantially improved from previous years. The MOM's information campaign that helped inform foreign workers of their rights played a large role in this. This campaign was continued and expanded as is noted in the 2007 report. During this reporting period, the MOM conducted random interviews of foreign domestic workers to get a sense of the impacts of their policies and efforts. In 2008, efforts at curbing prostitution led to many arrests of foreign women. In this year, a compulsory course on domestic safety and workers rights for all foreign domestic workers was introduced. Dropping to the level of Tier 2 Watchlist, it was noted in the 2010 U.S. TIP Report that the Singaporean government made no discernible progress in working to mitigate human trafficking in the country. In 2014, the country increased its prevention efforts and a continued increase has been noted in every report in years since. In late 2019, an expansion was made to the mandatory orientation program that was implemented for foreign migrant construction workers in 2017 to include foreign migrant workers in other industries such as manufacturing. The compulsory classes that are led by local NGOs go over things such as workers’ rights and the resources available to them. The Singaporean government also continued to allot money to the cause of public awareness campaigns on human trafficking.

== Impacts of Covid-19 pandemic on governmental efforts ==
The COVID-19 pandemic imposed certain restrictions on everyday activities that also impacted governmental and non-governmental efforts toward prosecution, protection and prevention as it relates to human trafficking in the country. Resulting changes impacted the number of people that these entities were able to assist as well as the manner in which they could be assisted. The efforts of frontline workers were shifted to pandemic mitigation measures and the government maintained cooperation with NGOs to provide services to victims. The occupancy capacities of shelters for victims had to be altered to comply with social distancing measures and due to this, the Ministry of Social and Family Development opened another temporary shelter to create sufficient space for those in need. The MOM allotted funds for two more shelters intended for use by male foreign workers and male victims of trafficking. Although noted that there were impacts to all governmental efforts, protection and prevention efforts were described as remaining consistent with previous years.

== See also ==
- Human rights in Singapore
