= Domestic Worker's Bill of Rights =

Legislation for labor protection for domestic workers

Kamala Harris with Pramila Jayapal and Ai-jen Poo discuss the Domestic Workers Bill of Rights in 2019.

A Domestic Workers' Bill of Rights is legislation designed to grant basic labor protections to domestic workers. These laws are supported by organizations such as the National Domestic Workers Alliance, an American labor advocacy group founded in 2007, and the National Advocacy Coalition for Domestic Workers (JALA PRT) in Indonesia. The first such law took effect in New York state on November 29, 2010. Among other rights, this law gave domestic workers the right to overtime pay, a day of rest every seven days, three paid days of rest each year (after one year of work for the same employer), protection under the state human rights law, and a special cause of action for domestic workers who suffer sexual or racial harassment.

In July 2013, Hawaii became the second state to implement basic labor protections for domestic workers. In January 2014, similar legislation took effect in California; by 2019, nine states had enacted legislation granting labor rights to domestic workers.

Indonesia's parliament introduced a Bill on Protection of Domestic Workers in 2004, which eventually passed in April 2026.

== Background ==
In the United States, it is estimated that over two million women can be considered a domestic worker. Domestic workers fulfill various roles from nannies, housekeepers, and caregivers. Domestic workers may work as a caregiver of a person, place, or thing outside the home performing domesticated responsibilities. Domestic workers can also work in environments outside of a personal residential home such as a nursing home, childcare center or home, as an employee of a caregiving agency, or as an independent direct-pay employee. Most of domestic workers are foreign born and the primary income earners in their families. Of these foreign born, most are women of color.

In the 20th century, domestic workers were majority African Americans, whose exploitation was deliberate as the history of them was related to slavery in the United States. The result was that Southern members of Congress, states where slavery was a valuable asset, prevented domestic workers to be included under federal labor laws during the New Deal era.

No protections or laws for workplace standards covered domestic workers. Privately employed domestic workers are the most isolated and exploited members of the workforce. Domestic workers frequently face issues such as long work hours for low pay, sudden terminations, no specific sick or personal or vacations days, and physical or verbal abuse. Even if domestic workers seek support when their rights are violated, there were none available as they are not covered under civil rights laws, the National Labor Relations Act (NLRA) or the Occupational Safety and Health Act (OSHA).

The structure of the domestic labor industry contributed to the difficulty of formally establishing legal rights, as it is difficult to organize domestic workers and enforce a labor standard that will be followed by all employers. Workplaces are private homes that vary in the treatment of workers.

== National and subnational initiatives ==
=== Indonesia ===
As of 2024, it was estimated that there were 4.2 million domestic workers in Indonesia, of whom 90% were women. These workers were not legally classified as workers, and so there were few specific regulations to protect them. A Bill on the Protection of Domestic Workers in Indonesia was introduced in 2004, and eventually passed on April 21, 2026 (22 years later). The act includes stipulations requiring vocational training as well as health and unemployment benefits for domestic workers. It also prohibits children under 18 from being hired as domestic workers. It did not directly stipulate a minimum wage for domestic workers, but included provisions for additional regulations to be passed and enforced over a 12-month period from the passage of the bill. The bil was primarily supported by the National Advocacy Coalition for Domestic Workers (JALA PRT).

Prior to the passage of the Bill on the Protection of Domestic Workers in Indonesia, the effective law was the Ministerial Regulation No. 2 on the Protection of Domestic Workers (2015), which laid out requirements for written employment contracts and rights including wages, treatment, freedom of religion, and work leave, but had no provisions for enforcement.

==== Jakarta ====
The first regulations for the protection of domestic workers were issued by Jakarta Province in 1993, and repealed and replaced with a more modern version in 2004. it specifically set out regulations for "recruitment and placement agencies" for domestic workers, including providing shelters and welfare facilities, but did not specifically stipulate the rights of domestic workers themselves.

==== Yogyakarta ====
Governor’s Regulation No. 31 of 2010 on Domestic Workers stipulated that rights of domestic workers include vacation, wages, freedom from violence, and sick leave, among other rights. It also required formal spoken or written employment contracts to be formally reported to the head of the relevant neighbourhood association unit.

=== United States ===
==== New York ====
A Domestic Workers' Bill of Rights campaign started in 2003. It was pushed by the Domestic Workers United (DWU) and the NY Domestic Workers Justice Coalition. After a six-year grassroots campaign, the Governor of New York signed the Domestic Worker's Bill of Rights.

Under the New York Domestic Workers' Bill of Rights, a domestic worker is defined as someone who works in another person's home who is not related to them and is not a part-time job. This bill gives domestic workers an eight-hour work day and overtime (time and a half) for working over 40 hours a week (or 44 hours if the employee resides in the home of their employer). This law also establishes that workers must be granted one day (24 hours) off every seven days of work or be paid overtime pay if the employee agrees to work on this day. Also, after one year of work with the same employer, domestic workers are granted three paid days off every year.

Although domestic workers were already covered by the minimum wage law, this bill ensures that domestic workers receive $7.25 per hour. Employers must pay their workers weekly and cannot deduct money from the employee's paycheck without written permission. Employers must now keep a payroll and provide workers with written notifications regarding sick days, vacation days, and work schedules. Domestic workers who work at least 40 hours a week are now entitled to Workers' Compensation Insurance and Disability Benefits. This law also gives domestic workers coverage under the New York State Human Rights Law if they have been harassed due to gender, race, sex, religion, or origin. The employer cannot make any unwanted sexual advances including both physical and verbal sexual actions. If the worker files a complaint, the employer cannot retaliate. This law covers all full-time workers, including immigrants. This law does not cover people who are related to the person they care for, or if they are a part-time worker, such as a baby-sitter.

==== Hawaii ====
Hawaii governor Neil Abercrombie signed a domestic workers bill of rights in July 2013, making Hawaii the second U.S. state to give nannies, housekeepers and others protections on wages and other labor issues. The domestic workers bill in Hawaii makes it illegal to discriminate against domestic workers based on several factors, including race, gender and sexual orientation. It also establishes protections, overtime, rest breaks, and protection from abuse and harassment for them. It covers cooks, waiters, butlers and others, including some baby sitters; it went into effect immediately.

==== California ====
California had a years-long debate about passing a Domestic Workers Bill of Rights. A 2012 California bill, which was inspired by the New York Domestic Workers Bill of Rights, would have entitled domestic workers to overtime pay, eased eligibility requirements for workers' compensation, and provided them with meal and rest breaks, the right to eight hours of sleep, and the right to use their employers’ kitchens to cook their own food. That bill passed the state Senate and the concurrence vote in the Assembly, but California Governor Jerry Brown vetoed it on September 30, 2012.

However, the Domestic Workers Bill of Rights (AB 241) was signed into law by California Governor Jerry Brown on September 26, 2013, and went into effect on January 1, 2014. The law makes nannies, private healthcare aides and other domestic workers in California eligible for overtime pay if they work more than nine hours a day or 45 hours a week.

==== Washington ====
The city of Seattle is the first to add a minimum wage, set break times, and political representation to all domestic workers. It was unanimously passed July 23, 2018, and will be enforced starting July 1, 2019. The legislation classifies domestic workers as independent contractors, whose pay must be the equivalent to minimum wage, and prohibits employers from keeping workers' personal documents like passports. Future regulations will be made by a newly established 13-member board.
