= Nanny tax =

Tax term in the United States

In the United States, the combination of payroll taxes withheld from a household employee and the employment taxes paid by their employer are commonly referred to as the nanny tax. Under US law, any family or individual that pays a household employee more than a certain dollar amount per year ($2,400 as of 2022) must withhold and pay Social Security and Medicare taxes, also known as FICA. The law mandates that all domestic workers, such as cooks, nannies, housekeepers and gardeners, are subject to the nanny tax. Federal unemployment insurance taxes must also be paid if the household pays any number of employees a total of $1,000 or more in a calendar quarter. State unemployment insurance taxes have the same requirement with the exceptions of California ($750), New York ($500), and Washington, D.C. ($500), which have lower thresholds.

The law does not allow a household employer to classify a domestic worker as an independent contractor when the employer sets the employee's schedule, dictates how duties are to be performed, and provides the tools and equipment to do the work. The employment taxes are paid by an agency instead of by the household if the agency carries the nanny or employee on the agency's books as an employee. Parents that hire babysitters for their children are also required to pay the nanny tax if compensation exceeds the annual wage threshold for any one sitter. Employers of household workers can offer benefits such as parking, public transportation, college tuition, and health insurance as non-taxable compensation.

== Compliance requirements ==
Five steps are required to comply with nanny tax laws in most states:

1. The employer must establish tax accounts with the Internal Revenue Service (IRS) and state tax agencies and obtain an Employer Identification Number (EIN). Employers must also obtain a completed Form I-9 for every employee. This form is used to verify the identity and employment eligibility of a domestic worker.
2. Social Security, Medicare - commonly referred to as FICA taxes - and any other required state taxes may be withheld from each paycheck. If the employer is withholding, the employer may withhold 7.65% of the employee's cash wages for FICA taxes. Employers pay an FICA tax equal to the same amount. Anything not withheld, other than income taxes, must be paid by the employer. Employers also pay federal unemployment taxes, which is 6% of the first $7,000 of wages per employee (commonly reduced to 0.6% when state unemployment taxes are paid on time). Household employers are not required to withhold federal and state income taxes from their employee.
3. The employer must file any required state unemployment insurance and state income tax returns and remit the appropriate payments to the state as required by each state.
4. By January 31 of each year, the employer must provide a Form W-2 to the employee and file a W-2 Copy A and W-3 with the Social Security Administration.
5. A Schedule H with the employer's personal income tax return (Form 1040) that summarizes the FICA taxes and federal income taxes withheld from the employee and the FICA and federal unemployment insurance taxes paid by the employer must be completed.

To avoid penalties for underpayment of estimated tax, the employer should ensure that sufficient funds to cover the employee and employer's share of Social Security and Medicare taxes, federal income taxes withheld from the employee and federal unemployment taxes are paid to the IRS throughout the year, either by additional withholding on Form W-4 or via Form 1040-ES.

Nanny taxes are also required in many countries outside the U.S. For example, in the UK, hiring a nanny to work in a home requires the employer to pay tax and National Insurance on behalf of the nanny or risk monthly fines of £100.

== Nany tax protects nannies by prohibiting their employment as independent contractors ==
Under U.S. law, workers who provide services in a private home are generally classified as employees. Providing a nanny, housekeeper, or senior caregiver a Form 1099 and treating them as an independent contractor is incorrect.

Misclassification – the practice of treating an employee as an independent contractor – is a major enforcement priority of the US Department of Labor. Household employment is a targeted field. In 2015, Wage and Hour Division investigations into misclassified workers resulted in more than $74 million in back-wage payments for more than 102,000 nationwide workers. Those payments, in addition to penalties and interest, were coming out of the employer’s pockets.

Domestic service workers who are improperly treated as an independent contractor pay their own employment taxes, and lose the safety nets of unemployment compensation when the job ends and workers compensation insurance should they suffer a workplace injury.

== Tax breaks ==
There are two tax breaks for child care costs: the child and dependent care credit and a pre-tax flexible spending account through the employer. The credit can be claimed by attaching Form 2441 to a personal income tax return and can reduce an employer's tax bill by $600, for one dependent, or $1,200 for two or more dependents. With an FSA, up to $5,000 in pre-tax earnings to pay for child care for children under 13 are allowed. Tax breaks associated with the nanny tax are detailed in IRS Publication 503, Child and Dependent Care Expenses.

== Compliance statistics ==
A survey produced by the Park Slope Parents revealed that 63 percent of respondents reported that they pay their nannies completely off the books and do not pay the nanny tax, 10 percent said they pay partly on and partly off the books, 15 percent said they pay completely on the books, and 12 percent refused to answer. 68 percent of the respondents who do pay on the books use a service or accountant to pay nanny taxes while 22 percent handle the accounting themselves. Trends towards online hiring and short-term and part-time nanny employment have been shown to reduce compliance with nanny tax laws in recent years. In cases of noncompliance, a former household employee seeking state unemployment benefits may trigger an IRS audit. The employer may be liable for back taxes, interest and penalties to multiple government agencies. The nanny tax received considerable attention in 1993 during Nannygate, when Zoë Baird, Bill Clinton’s nominee for United States Attorney General, was forced to withdraw after revelations surfaced that she had employed illegal aliens as a nanny and a chauffeur and failed to pay employment taxes. In 2006, a Nannygate-like controversy developed in Sweden when it was revealed that several members of Prime Minister Fredrik Reinfeldt’s cabinet had employed domestic workers but neglected to pay the required taxes.

== See also ==
- Domestic worker
- Kafala system
- Slavery
