= Pan toting =

Payment to workers in goods and leftovers

Pan toting, also known as the service pan, was the practice of African-American domestic workers taking dry goods or leftover table scraps from their white employers as a form of compensation that they deserved, due to the wealth they produced for their masters during their former status as slaves and because of the low wages received post-Civil War. As their way of seeking justice, domestic workers implemented the strategy of "pan-toting" by "re-appropriating the material assets of their employers for their use."

== Origins ==
Pan-toting originated in slavery in the United States, during the nineteenth century, among the African-American population. This practice evolved during the transition from slave to free labor, as an expression of a "moral economy". It is consistent with the "vales" and perquisites claimed by servants across cultures, dating back centuries.

After the end of the Civil War and the abolition of slavery, African-American domestic workers, as free laborers, continued this practice, to express their opposition to work conditions that deprived them of a decent standard of living, drawing on decades of experiences with creative resistance. African-American domestic workers also claimed the right to this form of compensation due to their former status as slaves, for the unpaid work they had then performed for their masters and the white community.

In addition to paying low wages, some employers were dishonest about wages owed, deprived workers of wages for a length of time, or outright refused to pay wages. These deprived and frustrated workers then used pan-toting as a counter-measure, both for making ends meet and asserting their new-found freedom. There were various forms of compensation that domestic workers could receive instead of actual wages. The most common item was food; and the cook, who had easy access to leftover food from their employer's kitchen, was the most likely to engage in pan-toting. Clothing was also taken as partial compensation.

Household laborers expected employers to acknowledge their duty to ensure basic needs by supplementing wages with leftover food, or they would reclaim the fruits of their labor without the employers' consent. Some employers knowingly allowed the practice, openly admitting that they paid low wages with the workers' getting the table scraps in mind. Other employers interpreted "free" labor to mean their expropriating labor without compensation. If the employer did not recognize this obligation, some workers would leave without consent.

== Dependence ==
Many African-American workers and their families depended on this form of payment. This leftover food was important to their survival. For example, the "service pan" augmented wages in almost two-thirds of the employers' households in Athens, Georgia, in 1913. A "Negro Nurse", writing in 1912, describes this dependence:

Well, I'll be frank with you, if it were not for the service pan, I don't know what the majority of our Southern colored families would do. The service pan is the mainstay in many a home...others may denounce the service pan, and say that it is used to support idle Negroes but many a time, when I was a cook and had the responsibility of rearing my three children upon my lone shoulders, many a time I have had the occasion to bless the Lord for the service pan!

Consequently, because African-American domestic workers and their families relied on "pan-toting", their diets were decided by, and depended on, the white employer. Most poignantly, Richard Wright remembered waiting for his mothers' employers to finish their meals so that he could learn what his own dinner would be:

If the white people left anything, my brother and I would eat well; but if they did not, we would have our usual bread and tea. Watching the white people eat would make my empty stomach churn and I would grow vaguely angry. Why could I not eat when I was hungry? Why did I always have to wait until others were through? I could not understand why some people had food and others did not.

"Toting" was a custom important to African-American families, but it could not always ensure a steady supply of food. Some employers recognized this. One employer stated:

...there are hungry children in the cabin awaiting their mothers return, when I give out my meals I bear these little blackberry pickaninnies in mind, and I never wound the feelings of any cook by asking her 'what that is she has under her apron'...I know what it is – every biscuit, scrap of meat, or bit of cake she can save during the day, and if possible, a little sugar filched from the pantry.

== Advantages ==
=== Advantages for the worker ===
Domestic workers, who had no legal remedies to redress grievances, could use pan-toting to alleviate the effects of being poorly paid and to counter employers' dishonesty involving wages. For many domestic workers, pan-toting meant the difference between starvation and survival. It allowed them to stretch their resources and put food on the dinner table for their family. For some, pan-toting was seen as adding to the status of being a domestic worker, as it gave them greater control over their employer and their employment.

=== Advantages for the employer ===
The system of pan-toting had advantages for employers, too. Most notably, it meant that they could "pay less in cash wages, and they might hope, that because her family would have some at the end of the day, the cook would take extra care with the food, producing a finer result". In addition to the cash savings, some employers who allowed toting could have the psychological benefit of seeing "reinforced the stereotype of African Americans as morally bankrupt and shifty characters and reinforced the notions of black inferiority and dependency and white paternalism".

== Disadvantages for workers ==
Due to its origins in slavery, pan-toting is usually associated with keeping black domestics as inferior and reliant on their white employer, while allowing the employer to feel superior. Many white employers saw the practice as charity that allowed them to escape accountability for "paying substandard wages that engendered the need for the 'gift'". Many argued pan-toting was a form of payment and used it to justify the low wages. "We know that most of this so-called 'food' is left-overs, cold scraps and the like which we would not use on our tables again," a city-dwelling, self-proclaimed "Old Time Southerner" admitted. "We know that our servants are paid a small wage." Another employer similarly conceded: "Totin' was a well-established custom, and should be remembered if the wages paid to seem horrifyingly small".

The quality of the food from pan-toting was not always good or plentiful. African-American families received leftover food on the employers' terms, and the quality was often poor. "Washingtonian Nellie Willoughby recalled receiving leftover roast beef – the tough, hard ends of the cut". The family often had to wait long hours for the worker to return home with the food. "Educator William Henry Holtzclaw, born about 1875, remembered genuine hunger waiting for his mother to return from her cooking job".

Furthermore, white families ate foods strange to some African-American palates, and families who relied on the service pan sometimes had to accept uncommon food not of their choosing. Audrey Smith recalled having to learn to eat the pheasant, lamb, and veal that her mother, Georgia Anderson, brought home from Maymont. Throughout the South, cooks for Jewish families brought home chopped liver, kugel, and other Eastern European delicacies as part of their "hookarm". If the food was good, plentiful, and regular, the cook might gratefully accept the service pan; but if the supply were inconsistent, the cook's family suffered.

== Rejection by workers ==
Some domestic workers took the opposite approach and rejected pan-toting. "To preserve this valued independence, three black domestics explained, they avoided borrowing from whites, even if this meant going without much-needed money." Some black domestics rejected such borrowing because it meant they were "still linked to white families in ways that were but one step away from the plantation system". From 1900, domestic workers felt "an uneasiness about such 'gifts'". "I told them I didn't tote", said one, discussing the "old days" about slavery, when whites did not pay, except by giving food in the "service pan". Black women correctly associated these gifts with a system designed to keep them in the service of whites, and leaving them without the monetary means to achieve a higher standard of living. Several African-American domestic workers began to refuse food and claimed they would not tote, especially in the 1920s. Many white women remembered black domestic workers refusing to tote and "making it a condition of their acceptance of a job that they not be asked to do so". These workers expressed a sense of disapproval and did not want to be compensated with leftover food in lieu of higher wages.

== Regarded by employers as theft ==
A number of white employers and authorities began to denounce pan-toting as theft and a crime. Katharine Du Pre Lumpkin recalled her upbringing in an upper-class white home: "We verily believed that a Negro could not help but steal. So we acted accordingly. We must lock up our valuables. We children should never leave the key in the food pantry door, but turn it and put it back in its hiding place". Another employer celebrated the departure of a cook as they believed her to be a thief: "This is our Emancipation day! We are free from Susan Bell...She has been robbing our table for months to support her mother".

A number of African-American domestic workers denied such accusations. In 1912, The Independent—a progressive New York City journal edited at the time by a prominent abolitionist, Henry Ward Beecher—printed a quasi-autobiographical account of servant life by an African-American who was born and raised in the South and was a domestic worker for more than 30 years. In this journal she mentions the practice of pan-toting. She states:

I do not deny that the cooks find opportunity to hide away at times, along with the cold 'grub' a little sugar, a little flour, a little meal, or a little piece of soap; but I indignantly deny that we are thieves. We don't steal; we just 'take' things—they are a part of the oral contract, expressed or implied. We understand it, and most of the white folks understand it.

As domestic workers became more resistant, employers became more repressive and began attacking pan-toting in an attempt to control them. They believed it resulted in the spouses of domestic workers becoming lazy and that it would poorly affect the economy if healthy men were not working. They therefore wanted pan-toting banned. This song about black men portrays the attitude employers resented:

I doan has to work so ha'd
I's got a gal in a white man's ya'd
Ebery night 'bout half pas' eight
I goes 'round to the white man's gate
She brings me butter and she brings me la'd
I doan has to work so ha'd!

Some whites disagreed with such attempts to ban the practice. "Some feared that ending the tradition would alienate black women and encourage them to quit". Domestic workers in Thomasville, Georgia, threatened to quit if regulations monitoring pan-toting were passed. This resulted in the town's newspaper warning officials to exercise caution. Other employers recognized that criminalizing customary rights would be perceived as insulting to domestic workers. "The cook's dignity is a factor in all domestic service contracts. That dignity is immediately offended if the housewife questions her about the rations she totes off after supper", a Montgomery newspaper editorialized. The "Old Time Southerner" stated her objections to regulating pan-toting: "If I consent to my servant taking a little food home that is my business".
