= The Maid Narratives =

2012 book by Katherine van Wormer, David W. Jackson III, and Charletta Sudduth

The Maid Narratives: Black Domestics and White Families in the Jim Crow South
- Cover
- Author: Katherine van Wormer, David W. Jackson III, and Charletta Sudduth
- Language: English
- Genre: Oral history, African-American history
- Publisher: Louisiana State University Press
- Publication date: 2012
- Publication place: United States
- Media type: Print (hardcover, paperback), e-book
- Pages: 320
- ISBN: 978-0-8071-4968-3 (hardcover)
- OCLC: 794700941

The Maid Narratives: Black Domestics and White Families in the Jim Crow South is a 2012 collection of oral histories by Katherine van Wormer, David W. Jackson III, and Charletta Sudduth, published by Louisiana State University Press. The authors present the recorded memories of African American women who worked as maids, cooks, and caretakers in the segregated South, alongside the recollections of white southerners who grew up in households that employed them. Interviewing more than fifty people, most of whom had ties to the Great Migration from rural Mississippi to Iowa, they document domestic service under Jim Crow: the labor, the racial etiquette, the intimate yet unequal relationships between servant and employer. The book places these accounts within the history of sharecropping, paternalism, and the civil rights movement.

== Overview ==
The work is based on interviews with more than fifty African American women who worked as domestic servants in the segregated South and white southerners who grew up in households that employed them. The three authors had ties to the subject: Katherine van Wormer, a sociologist, grew up white in New Orleans in a household with a maid; David W. Jackson III, a historian of African American studies, descended from women who worked as domestics; and Charletta Sudduth was raised in Iowa by a mother who had been a sharecropper and maid in Oxford, Mississippi. The research took place in Waterloo, Iowa, where many interviewees had settled after leaving Mississippi during the Great Migration. Jackson and Sudduth interviewed the black women, while van Wormer interviewed the white participants.

The oral histories are preceded by three background chapters on the southern caste system, the paternalism of domestic service, and the Great Migration. Based on John Dollard, Hortense Powdermaker, Judith Rollins, and Susan Tucker, the authors describe the caste system of the cotton-growing South from the 1920s through the mid-1960s, when sharecropping and a kind of quasi-feudalism replaced the slave economy. To capture the essence and uniqueness of southern racial etiquette, the authors draw on insights from contemporary scholarship and southern literature. They trace southern paternalism, in which benevolent white authority over black workers was exchanged for performed deference and a measure of economic protection. Its female counterpart, "maternalism," governed domestic service: white mistresses offered leftover food ("toting") and cast-off gifts in lieu of fair wages. A chapter on the Great Migration describes how the Chicago Defender, the boll weevil, and northern industrial wages drew six million black southerners from the rural South between 1900 and 1970. Many of the book's subjects left Mississippi for meatpacking or domestic work in Iowa. The writers place the American case alongside scholarship on domestic workers in South Africa, the Philippines, Latin America, and Britain, where similar patterns of paternalism and racialized deference occurred.

Part II presents thirteen oral histories of African American women, arranged from oldest to youngest. Over a hundred pages of lightly edited transcript, the chapter moves from cooking, cleaning, and childcare to civil rights activism and recollections of the Emmett Till murder. Elra Johnson, born in 1906 in Durant, Mississippi, recounted with defiant humor how, when the Ku Klux Klan came to her house, she sat on the porch, armed, and refused to move. Pearline Sisk Jones, born 1918, worked in William Faulkner's Oxford home, Rowan Oak, and remembered him as "a thin, straight man" who "loved fried meat and sorghum molasses." Vinella Byrd, of Pine Bluff, Arkansas, recalled a farmer who would not let her wash her hands in the family's wash pan. Irene Williams, of Springhill, Louisiana, said, "I wish to God I could tell you more, but it's too painful." Patterns repeat: entering through the back door, eating separately, being called by first name while using "Miss" and "Mister" for white children, receiving pay so low it would "shock" their grandchildren. Seven of the thirteen had migrated from the Deep South to Des Moines or Waterloo between the 1950s and 1970s.

The book's central chapter is thematic rather than chronological, organizing the testimony around the textures of domestic service (paternalism, child-rearing, education, racial etiquette, the mistress-maid bond) and the violence shadowing it: the sexual vulnerability of black women, the Emmett Till murder, and the resilience these women drew on in response.

Exclusion from intimate domestic space runs through all of it. Of the seventeen women, fourteen were barred from the front door, fifteen from the family table, and eleven from the family toilet. Resistance surfaces in the same register, like the woman whose sister recalled that she would "not only clean the bathroom, but I'd take a bath in the bathtub."

Part III gathers fifteen narratives from white women and two men who grew up with maids in Louisiana, Mississippi, Arkansas, Kentucky, and Tennessee. Most were recruited through an internet forum just after the release of the movie, The Help. Several submitted their accounts in writing, some under pseudonyms.

The white contributors reveal what the authors call cognitive dissonance: affection for a particular maid coexisting with the injustice of the system she worked in. Elise Talmage, van Wormer's mother, recalled asking as a child why the maids could not use the front door; her mother answered, "It's just not done." Elise Talmage called her family's maid Viola "my second mother," then remembered Viola's housing-projects apartment, where seven children shared one bedroom. Only Mary Hart, a white woman of Camden, Arkansas, describes a rupture in her acceptance of the social system. Reading Black Like Me, she wrote, "totally turned her life around," and she joined SNCC (The Student Nonviolent Coordinating Committee) and protested for civil rights.

The dissonance registers in what the white narratives cannot produce. Nine of the ten white respondents asked had no photograph of their maid. All described their maids as "members of the family." None of the black women interviewed used the phrase. One exception might have been Elizabeth Griffin, whose photograph is featured on the cover. Having no children of her own, she was proud of having worked and helped raise the children in the same home for two generations. Paula, the child on the left in the picture, named her daughter Elizabeth after the cook. The term cook, instead of maid, was commonly used in New Orleans in recognition of the fine Creole meals that were prepared by these women.

A companion chapter analyzes the white narratives across eight themes: denial, defensiveness, victim-blaming, maternalism, caretaking, bonding, regret, and defiance. The same patterns appear in research on white South Africans under apartheid, suggesting the dynamic is structural rather than regional. The difficulty of recruiting white participants, many of whom backed away after agreeing, itself registers the discomfort the chapter describes.

The epilogue gives each author a closing reflection. Van Wormer notes that segregation generated intimate bonds whose unequal terms the black women understood far better than the white families did. Jackson recognizes in the accounts the stories of his own grandmother and great-aunts. While Sudduth recalls the "countless stories of humility" and the laughter that ran through even the most painful recollections.

== Critics ==
In a review for the Journal of Southern History, Vanessa May praised the authors' decision to let the storytellers speak for themselves, which gave the accounts "a richness of detail and the feeling memories — the sounds, smells, and emotions — that can be obtained only in the personal narrative." The testimony, she noted, was personal and political at once: workers recalled having "stood with James Meredith" when he integrated the University of Mississippi. May criticized the book's historiography, which leaned on C. Vann Woodward and other 1960s scholars and skipped more recent work arguing that segregation's most disturbing feature was its modernity.

Valerie Grim called the work "well-documented and insightful" and placed it alongside Isabel Wilkerson's The Warmth of Other Suns and Kathryn Stockett's The Help. She praised the book for recovering the voices of grandmothers and great-grandmothers overlooked in the existing literature on the Great Migration.

Regina Bendix, a Swiss folklorist, found the book notable for pairing the recollections of black domestic workers with those of the white women and men they had cared for in the postwar decades. Bendix observed that "the occasional laughter resounding through the memories of the black women stands in contrast to the ambiguity in evidence in the materials of the white interlocutors in Part III, most of whom opted to offer written recollections." Many white participants declined to use their real names, which Bendix read as confirming the authors' account of defensiveness and denial. The demographic portrait, she argued, remained relevant: the stratification of the Jim Crow era persists in everyday life and political sentiment.

Jeannette Brown, an oral historian, noted that the African American transcripts were arranged chronologically by age, with each interviewee introduced before her testimony. The book, she observed, contained "much less oral narrative material from white employers" than from the black domestics, and most Part III participants had been recruited through an internet forum after the release of The Help. Brown found the separation of the narratives from the authors' thematic analysis productive: it let readers draw their own conclusions first, though she suggested it also "reinforces (or simply reflects) the social structure under which all of the interviewees existed."

Cynthia Leal Massey credited the book with filling "a gap in American history in a way that The Help, while illuminating and entertaining, cannot." The film, she observed, had spurred white women to come forward, though their ambivalence showed in the resulting narratives. The black narrators, by contrast, were frank: Irene Williams recounted being taken by white men in a car as a teenager, things that "were not talked about." Massey read the book as a portrait of resilience and resistance alongside exploitation, "much more complex than can be depicted in a fictionalized book and film."

Kristen Hannum called the book "a nonfiction look at the South's Jim Crow strict caste system" and compared it favorably to The Help. She valued the analytical chapters for the context they gave the interviews, pointing to the finding that "while all the whites saw their maids as part of the family, none of the black women recalled feeling that way." Vinella Byrd, forbidden to wash her hands in the wash pan, stood for Hannum as an example of the daily indignities the testimonies record. The authors, she thought, handled "that human complexity" with accessibility, and the sympathy ran both ways across the racial divide.
