= Hooch maid =

Vietnamese women employed as housekeepers for U.S. servicemen in the Vietnam War

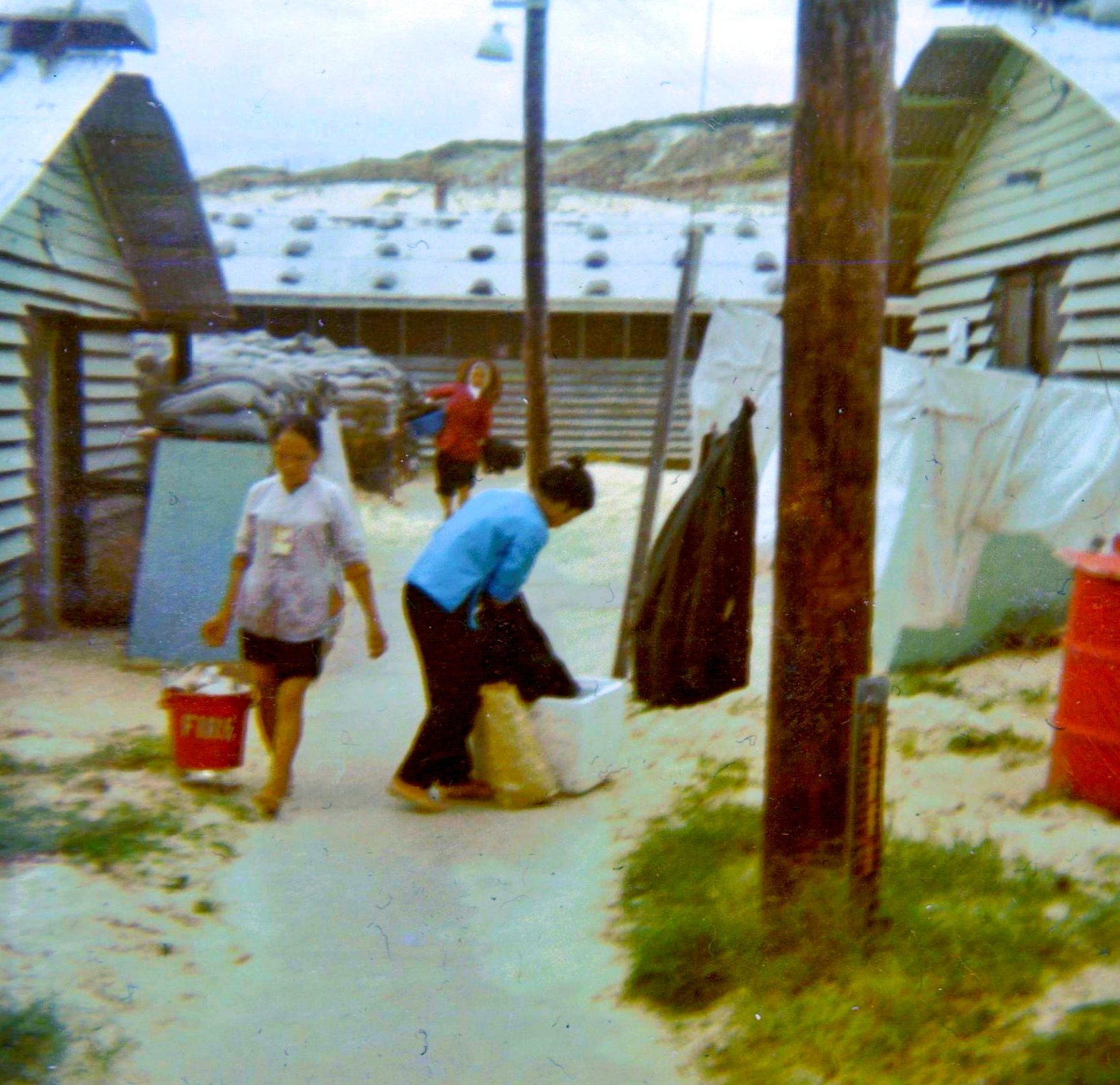
Hooch maids at work in 1971 on an American Army base

A hooch maid was a South Vietnamese woman employed to clean the shelters and keep house for American servicemen during the Vietnam War.

== Description ==
American soldiers in South Vietnam sometimes called the dwellings of Vietnamese civilians "hooches" (possibly a borrowing from Japanese 家 uchi, "dwelling"). Thus, the Vietnamese civilian women who maintained the dwellings were called "hooch maids". These women typically worked six days a week, cleaning and maintaining the rooms and belongings of the soldiers. If their work quality was deemed to be sufficient, they could be given goods from the base exchange, which could be turned into extra income on the black market.

The military generally allowed most officers and non-commissioned men to have hooch maids, whenever these men wanted and requested their services. In Da Nang, military trucks picked up the maids at designated stops in the city every morning, and returned them in the evening. Issues often arose between the soldiers and the maids, due to cultural differences, including how to clean clothes properly, and how much soap to use when washing the clothes. Maids also cooked for the men when appropriate.

The maids could earn as much as a captain in the South Vietnamese Army, although it was often less. One soldier described the maids as being "...good Catholics who might flirt with you but would never date an American soldier." Nonetheless, some maids reportedly had sex with soldiers to earn extra income.
