= Geraldine Roberts =

American activist

- Born: 1924; Pawhuska, Oklahoma
- Died: 1997 (aged 72–73); Cleveland, Ohio
- Occupations: Activist, domestic worker

Geraldine Roberts (1924-1997) was an American domestic worker, grassroots organizer, and activist from Cleveland, Ohio. She founded the first documented domestic workers’ rights organization in the post-war U.S., Domestic Workers of America. Inspired by the Black Power and Civil Rights Movement, Roberts fought for the rights of working-class Black women throughout her life.

== Early life ==
Geraldine Roberts was born in 1924 in Pawhuska, Oklahoma, to an African-American mother and a father who was African-American and Native American (Choctaw). When she was five, both of her parents died and she and her sister Elizabeth moved to Ola, Arkansas. There she lived with her maternal grandmother, Ella, a formerly enslaved woman who owned land, ran a farm and boarding house, and took in laundry to support her family. Roberts dreamed of getting an education but Ola did not offer many educational opportunities for Black children. The town had a segregated one-room schoolhouse for Black children, but the local government stopped funding the town’s Black school, and Roberts often had to leave school to help her grandmother work. At the age of twelve, Roberts ran away from her home in order to get more schooling. She ended up working in a kitchen, cooking for a traveling minstrel show. In the following years, she met and married a man named James Roberts. They had three children and moved to Cleveland, Ohio in 1944.

== Career and activism ==
In the 1940s, Cleveland was experiencing a second surge of Black migrants into the city as part of the Great Migration. Like Roberts, the majority lived on the East Side of Cleveland due to racist redlining policies. Upon moving to Cleveland, Roberts realized her lack of education and structural racism meant that the only job she could get would be a job in domestic service. As a domestic worker, Roberts faced harsh conditions that domestic workers across the country struggled with including pay below minimum wage, racist work environments, and the denial of benefits such as social security, unemployment, and worker’s compensation.

These experiences, as well as her childhood growing up in the South, led Roberts to become involved in the burgeoning Civil Rights Movement, both nationally and locally. She participated in school desegregation protests in Cleveland and followed the work of local activists Ruth Turner and Lewis G. Robinson. In an oral history, Roberts described the irony she felt holding picket signs that she couldn’t read during protests. “I wanted to fight for other little boys and girls who had experienced the same thing I had experienced as a child. And if it meant me carryin' a picket sign, if it also meant that I could get injured or die, I didn't think it meant much difference because I had already mentally, or I was dead. I couldn't read; I was sort of trapped in society; the best I could do was to help someone else.”

In 1965, when Roberts was working for a particularly hostile employer who monitored employees while they worked and prohibited the employees from speaking to each other at any point during the day, Roberts made a commitment to advocate for better working conditions for herself and colleagues. Her coworkers encouraged her to form a union and each gave her a dollar to begin one. In September 1965, she held the first meeting of Domestic Workers of America at St. James AME Church with the help of the Cleveland chapter of CORE. While 20 people attended that first meeting, by the third meeting in October, over 150 women were reported to have attended. To recruit new members, Roberts would stand at bus stops where many domestic workers boarded busses and she would hold signs, distribute leaflets, and chant slogans to get them involved.

DWA’s office moved across the city throughout its lifetime and in its early years were primarily funded by a grant from the Council of Economic Opportunity. Legal Aid of Cleveland, CORE, and other community volunteers helped DWA form a charter and a board; Geraldine Roberts was elected as president of the organization. At its peak in the late 1960s, DWA consisted of at least six hundred members. As an organization, DWA helped place domestic workers in job placements throughout the city, advocated locally and nationally for fair pay and benefits for the workers, and provided scholarships for workers to attend Cuyahoga Community College, among many other initiatives. By the 1980s, the organization’s funding and membership waned as nationally, many Black women left domestic work and many migrants from the Global South filled their positions.

Roberts remained active both in local and national organizing. While she was president of DWA, Roberts attended the first national conference of domestic worker organizers in 1971 in D.C. She also testified before the Ohio legislature to urge a minimum wage for domestic workers, and testified in Cleveland for the United States Commission on Civil Rights about her experience as a domestic worker, organizer, and working-class Black woman in Cleveland. In the 1970s, she ran unsuccessfully for both Cleveland City Council and the School Board of Cleveland Schools. In 1980, she organized a new group, the Grassroots Female Coalition that registered women voters and sought to address the needs of marginalized women. In the early 1990s, she formed the Grandmothers and Grandfathers Project that sought to organize older members of the community to support Cleveland’s youth.

== Personal life ==
Roberts married James Roberts, 22 years her senior, at the age of fourteen. He reportedly threatened to turn her in to the police for running away from home unless she married him. He also promised to help her get more education, and although he initially helped her enroll in night school in Cleveland, he eventually said that he could not watch the children and demanded she stop her schooling. The couple separated after twelve years of marriage. After her marriage ended, Roberts resumed her education and took evening classes at East Technical High School.

Roberts was friends with Louise Stokes, the mother of Carl and Louis Stokes, as they were both domestic workers. Both Carl and Louis Stokes supported Roberts’ activism.

Roberts died in her apartment in the Carver Park Apartment Housing Complex on December 4, 1997 at the age of 73.

=== Recognition ===
Roberts was a member of the Phillis Wheatley Association, the NAACP, Urban League and Lane Metropolitan C.M.E. Church. She received awards from Top Ladies of Distinction Inc., the Western Reserve Historical Society, and other civic organizations.
