= Welfare spending =

Means-oriented social benefit

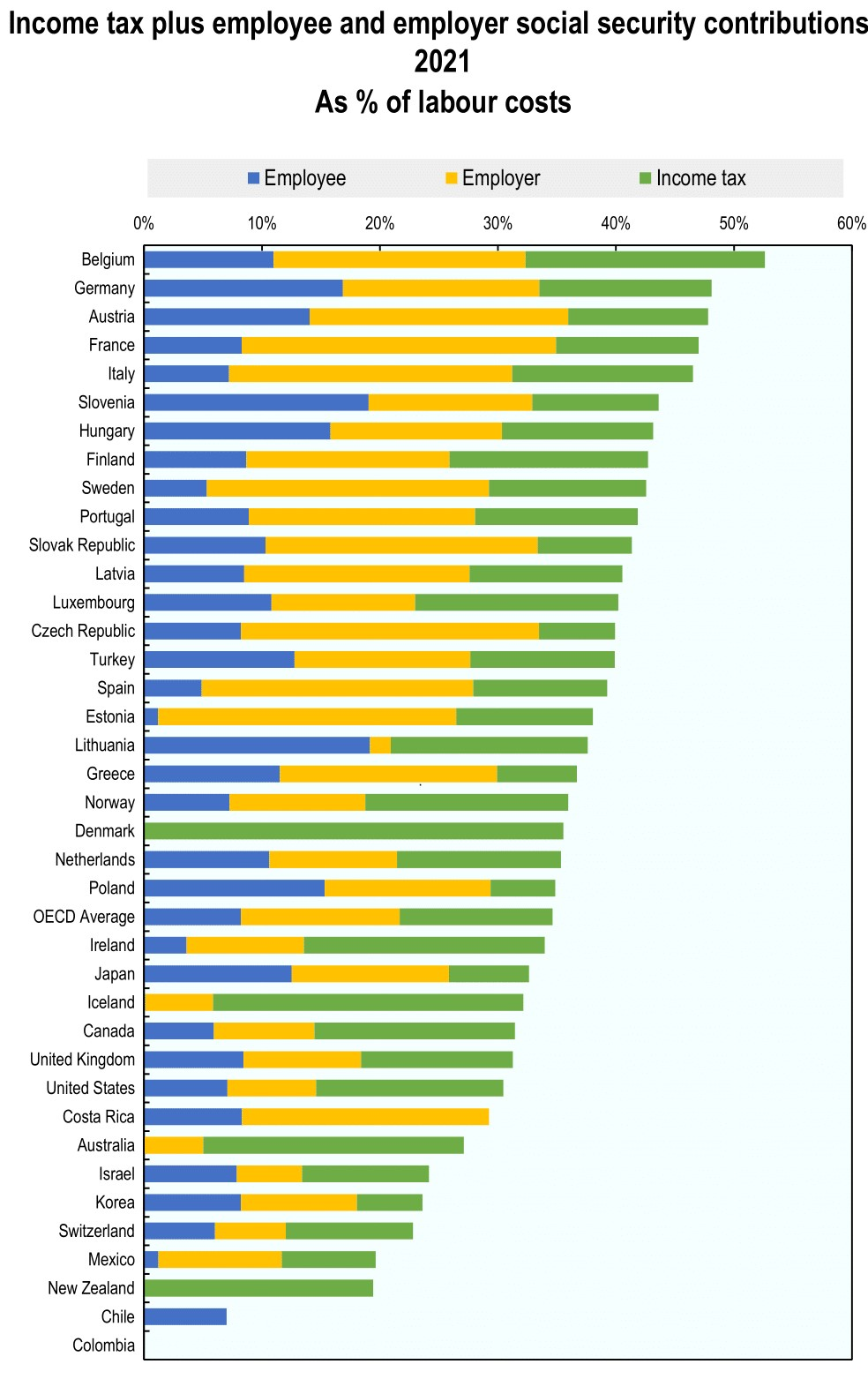
Welfare spending by employees and employers

Welfare spending is a type of government support intended to ensure that members of a society can meet basic human needs such as food and shelter. Social security may either be synonymous with welfare, (Note: Except in the United States and Canada, where welfare refers only to direct financial assistance for poor or disabled people. In the United States, it often refers to the Temporary Assistance for Needy Families program, while Social Security is a specific social insurance program.) or refer specifically to social insurance programs which provide support only to those who have previously contributed (e.g. pensions), as opposed to social assistance programs which provide support on the basis of need alone (e.g. most disability benefits). The International Labour Organization defines social security as covering support for those in old age, support for the maintenance of children, medical treatment, parental and sick leave, unemployment and disability benefits, and support for sufferers of occupational injury.

More broadly, welfare may also encompass efforts to provide a basic level of well-being through subsidized social services such as healthcare, education, infrastructure, vocational training, and public housing. In a welfare state, the state assumes responsibility for the health, education, infrastructure and welfare of society, providing a range of social services such as those described.

Some historians view systems of codified almsgiving, like the zakat policy of the seventh century (634 CE) Rashidun caliph Umar, as early examples of universal government welfare. The first welfare state was Imperial Germany (1871–1918), where the Bismarck government introduced social security in 1889. In the early 20th century, the United Kingdom introduced social security around 1913, and adopted the welfare state with the National Insurance Act 1946, during the Attlee government (1944–1951). In Western Europe, Australia, and New Zealand, social welfare is mainly provided by the government out of the national tax revenues, and to a lesser extent by non-government organizations (NGOs), and charities (social and religious). A right to social security and an adequate standard of living is asserted in Articles 22 and 25 of the Universal Declaration of Human Rights. (Note: Everyone, as a member of society, has the right to social security and is entitled to realization, through national effort and international co-operation and in accordance with the organization and resources of each State, of the economic, social and cultural rights indispensable for his dignity and the free development of his personality. [...] Everyone has the right to a standard of living adequate for the health and well-being of himself and of his family, including food, clothing, housing and medical care and necessary social services, and the right to security in the event of unemployment, sickness, disability, widowhood, old age or other lack of livelihood in circumstances beyond his control.)

== History ==
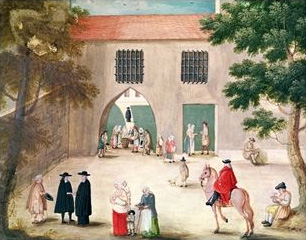
Distributing alms to the poor, abbey of Port-Royal des Champs c. 1710

In the Roman Empire, the first emperor Augustus provided the Cura Annonae or grain dole for citizens who could not afford to buy food every month. Social welfare was enlarged by the Emperor Trajan. Trajan's program brought acclaim from many, including Pliny the Younger. Other provisions for the poor were introduced during the history of Ancient Rome, such as the Alimenta.

The Song dynasty government (960 CE) supported multiple programs which could be classified as social welfare, including the state hospitals, low-interest loans for peasants, state orphanages, free pharmacies for the poor, filled state granaries, fire stations and libraries in the large cities, retirement homes, public clinics, and paupers' graveyards. According to economist Robert Henry Nelson, "the medieval Roman Catholic Church operated a far-reaching and comprehensive welfare system for the poor ...". Ancient Greek city-states provided free medical services for the poor and slaves. From the 14th century onward, the governments of the Italian city-states began to partner with the church to provide welfare and education to the lower classes. In the 18th Century, according to one study, the Qing Dynasty had "the most elaborate relief system in world history, based on state and local granaries that were used in times of shortage to stabilize food prices and provide relief to the urban and rural poor." This system, however, was weakened after imperialism entered China following the 1840 Opium War and the Taiping Rebellion (1850–1860), which resulted in a crisis in the Qing Dynasty. Following the foundation of the Republic in 1912 and the following years of civil wars and warlordism, "the state granary system became almost non-existent."

Throughout the history of the Byzantine Empire, various social welfare services and institutions were established. Provision was also made for the State to provide food and clothing for children that parents were unable to bring up due to indigence. In Ancient India, kings are said to have kept special granary stores to help people in times of need, and also (according to one study) “provided poor persons with food and seed corn to enable them to start farming.” Under Urukagina of Mesopotamia, welfare was provided for poor and elderly persons.

In later Protestant European nations such as the Dutch Republic, welfare was managed by local guilds until the abolition of the guild system in the early 19th century. In the free imperial cities of the Holy Roman Empire, the city governments in cities like Nuremberg could take control of the collection and distribution of public welfare. In 1520, Martin Luther called for (in an "Appeal to the Christian Nobility of the German nation") the abolition of begging and provisions for those in need. In 1523, following a request by the citizens of Leisnig, in Saxony, Luther devised a plan for a "Common Chest," under which "There shall be ordered for God's house and kept in place for all time, two casks or council chests in which bread, cheese, eggs, meat and other food and provisions shall be placed; and there shall also be a box or two wherein money may be put for the upkeep of the common chest."

Reflecting Luther's views, in 1522 the Wittenberg Church order set up a "common chest" for welfare work which provided various means of support for the poor. In France in 1536, as noted by one study, "Francis I ordered each parish to register its poor and provide for the impotent from contributed funds." Prior to this, systems of organized relief had been set up in Rouen, Lyons, and Paris. Also in regards to Europe, one historian has argued that "The Dutch were also renowned for their support of the virtuous poor and the young in need."

Various forms of social welfare were also established in the Inca Empire, the Aztec Empire, the Ottoman Empire, and in precolonial Africa. Under the Mughal emperor Akbar, agricultural loans were provided together with tax remissions in cases of crop failure.

The seventh century caliph Umar implemented a form of zakat, one of the Five Pillars of Islam, as a codified universal social security tax. Traditionally estimated at 2.5% of an individual's assets, government zakat funds were distributed to various groups of Muslims, including impoverished people and those in severe debt. The collection of zakat increased during the Umayyad and Abbasid caliphates, though the zakat system was frequently inefficient and corrupt; Islamic jurists often instructed Muslims to distribute money to the needy directly instead to maximize its impact.

Likewise, in Jewish tradition, charity (represented by tzedakah) is a matter of religious obligation rather than benevolence. Contemporary charity is regarded as a continuation of the Biblical Maaser Ani, or poor-tithe, as well as Biblical practices, such as permitting the poor to glean the corners of a field and harvest during the Shmita (Sabbatical year).

There is relatively little statistical data on transfer payments before the High Middle Ages. In the medieval period and until the Industrial Revolution, the function of welfare payments in Europe was achieved through private giving or charity, through numerous confraternities and activities of different religious orders. Early welfare programs in Europe included the English Poor Relief Act 1601, which gave parishes the responsibility for providing welfare payments to the poor. This system was substantially modified by the 19th-century Poor Law Amendment Act 1834, which introduced the system of workhouses.

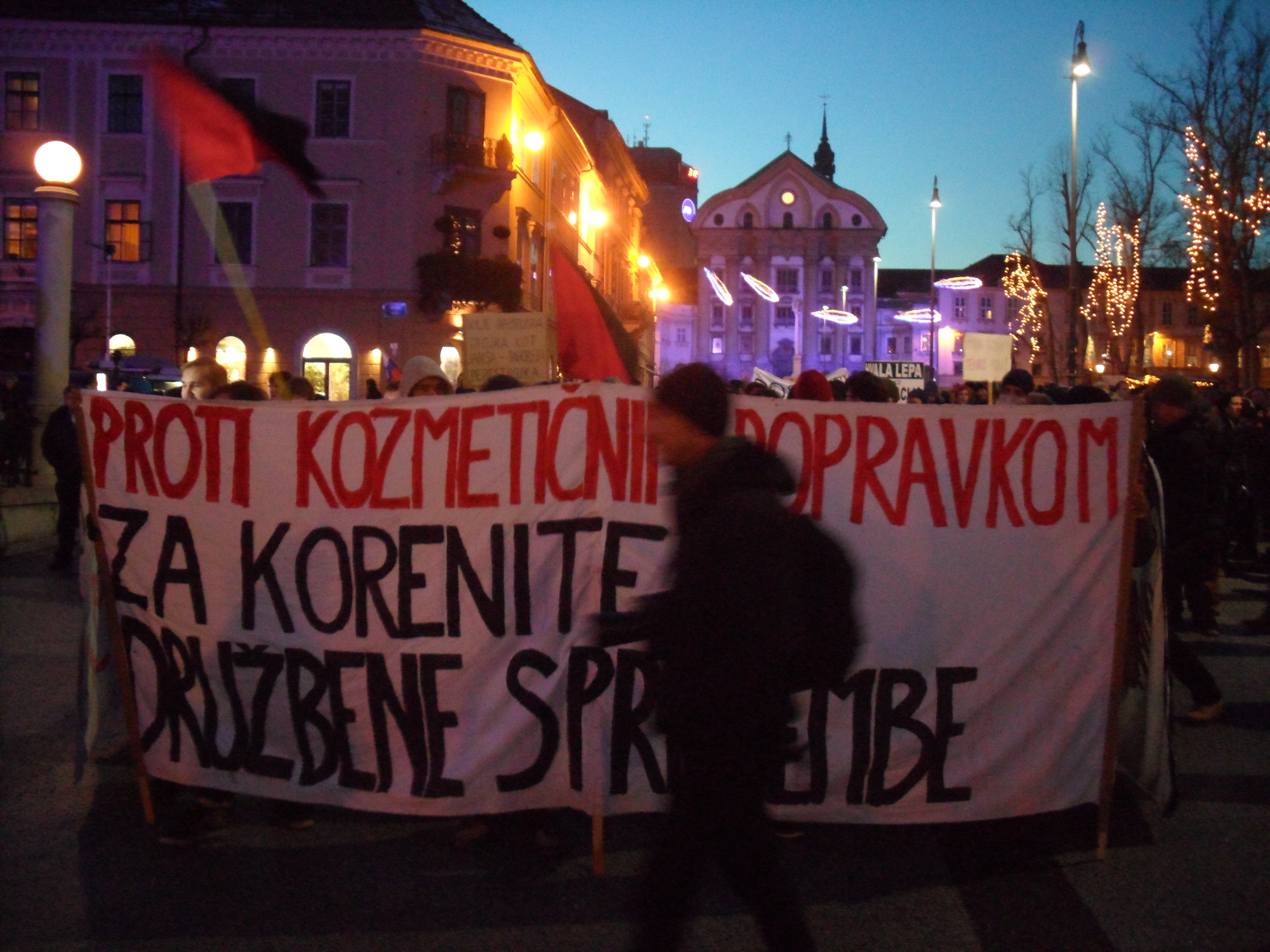
Anarchist protest against welfare cuts and austerity, Slovenia 2012

It was predominantly in the late 19th and early 20th centuries that an organized system of state welfare provision was introduced in many countries. Otto von Bismarck, Chancellor of Germany, introduced one of the first welfare systems for the working classes. In Great Britain the Liberal government of Henry Campbell-Bannerman and David Lloyd George introduced the National Insurance system in 1911, a system later expanded by Clement Attlee.

Modern welfare states include Germany, France, the Netherlands, as well as the Nordic countries, such as Iceland, Sweden, Norway, Denmark, and Finland which employ a system known as the Nordic model. Esping-Andersen classified the most developed welfare state systems into three categories; Social Democratic, Conservative, and Liberal.

A report published by the ILO in 2014 estimated only 27% of the world population has access to comprehensive social security. The World Bank's 2019 World Development Report argues that the traditional payroll-based model of many kinds of social insurance are "increasingly challenged by working arrangements outside standard employment contracts".

== Forms ==
Welfare can take a variety of forms, such as monetary payments, subsidies and vouchers, or housing assistance. Welfare systems differ from country to country, but welfare is commonly provided to individuals who are unemployed, those with illness or disability, the elderly, those with dependent children, and veterans. Programs may have a variety of conditions for a person to receive welfare:

- Social insurance, state-sponsored programs based partly on individual and employer contributions paid towards benefits such as healthcare, unemployment payments, and old-age pensions.
- Means-tested benefits, financial assistance provided for those who are unable to cover basic needs, such as food, clothing and housing, due to poverty or lack of income because of unemployment, sickness, disability, or caring for children. While assistance is often in the form of financial payments, those eligible for social welfare can usually access health and educational services free of charge. The amount of support is enough to cover basic needs and eligibility is often subject to a comprehensive and complex assessment of an applicant's social and financial situation. See also Income Support.
- Non-contributory benefits. Several countries have special schemes, administered with no requirement for contributions and no means test, for people in certain categories of need, such as veterans of armed forces, people with disabilities, and very old people.
- Discretionary benefits. Some schemes are based on the decision of an official, such as a social worker.
- Universal or categorical benefits, also known as demogrants. These are non-contributory benefits given for whole sections of the population without a means test, such as family allowances or the public pension in New Zealand (known as New Zealand Superannuation). See also the Alaska Permanent Fund Dividend.
- Welfare to work: This is when the government provides welfare benefits to the recipient while the recipient is required to take paid work or in some cases compulsory education. The idea is to assist welfare recipients in moving from government assistance to employment and achieving self-sufficiency.

Not all citizens use their social rights. Selective social rights have higher non-take-up rate than universal social rights due to the complexity of the information and the Bureaucracy. Sometimes people need the help of other people to mediate their rights.

== Perceptions ==
According to a 2012 review study, whether a welfare program generates public support depends on:

- whether the program is universal or targeted towards certain groups
- the size of the social program benefits (larger benefits incentivize greater mobilization to defend a social program)
- the visibility and traceability of the benefits (whether recipients know where the benefits come from)
- the proximity and concentration of the beneficiaries (this affects the ease by which beneficiaries can organize to protect a social program)
- the duration of the benefits (longer benefits incentivize greater mobilization to defend a social program)
- the manner in which a program is administered (whether the program is inclusive and follow principles).

Pope Francis has referred to welfare projects as valuable only as "temporary" or "provisional" responses to the problems of poverty: lasting and equitable structural changes are also needed to avoid dependence on welfare.

Differences in the transparency of individual welfare contributions and employer contributions through payroll taxes affects politics.

== Social protection ==
In developing countries, formal social security arrangements are often absent for the vast majority of the working population, in part due to reliance on the informal economy. Additionally, the state's capacity to reach people may be limited because of its limited infrastructure and resources. In this context, social protection is often referred to instead of social security, encompassing a broader set of means, such as labour market intervention and local community-based programs, to alleviate poverty and provide security against things like unemployment.

== Welfare reform ==
Welfare reforms are changes in the operation of a given welfare system aimed at improving the efficiency, equity, and administration of government assistance programs. Reform programs may have a various aims; sometimes the focus is on reducing or increasing the welfare state and at other times reforms may aim to ensure greater fairness and effectiveness at the same total welfare spending. Classical liberals, neoliberals, right-wing libertarians, and conservatives generally criticize welfare and other tax-funded services for reducing incentives to work, exacerbating the free-rider problem and redistribution. On the other hand, in their criticism of capitalism, both social democrats and other socialists generally criticize welfare reforms that minimize the public safety net and strengthen the capitalist economic system. Welfare reform is constantly debated because of the varying opinions on a government's need to balance providing guaranteed welfare benefits and promoting self-sufficiency.

== By country ==
=== Australia ===
Before 1900 in Australia, charitable assistance from benevolent societies, sometimes with financial contributions from the authorities, was the primary means of relief for people not able to support themselves. The 1890s economic depression and the rise of the trade unions and the Labor parties during this period led to a movement for welfare reform.

In 1900, the states of New South Wales and Victoria enacted legislation introducing non-contributory pensions for those aged 65 and over. Queensland legislated a similar system in 1907 before the Australian labor Commonwealth government led by Andrew Fisher introduced a national aged pension under the Invalid and Old-Aged Pensions Act 1908. A national invalid disability pension was started in 1910, and a national maternity allowance was introduced in 1912.

During the Second World War, Australia under a labor government created a welfare state by enacting national schemes for: child endowment in 1941 (superseding the 1927 New South Wales scheme); a widows' pension in 1942 (superseding the New South Wales 1926 scheme); a wife's allowance in 1943; additional allowances for the children of pensioners in 1943; and unemployment, sickness, and special benefits in 1945 (superseding the Queensland 1923 scheme).

=== Canada ===
Canada has a welfare state in the European tradition; however, it is not referred to as "welfare", but rather as "social programs". In Canada, "welfare" usually refers specifically to direct payments to poor individuals (as in the American usage) and not to healthcare and education spending (as in the European usage).

The Canadian social safety net covers a broad spectrum of programs, and because Canada is a federation, many are run by the provinces. Canada has a wide range of government transfer payments to individuals, which totaled $145 billion in 2006. Only social programs that direct funds to individuals are included in that cost; programs such as medicare and public education are additional costs.

Generally speaking, before the Great Depression, most social services were provided by religious charities and other private groups. Changing government policy between the 1930s and 1960s saw the emergence of a welfare state, similar to many Western European countries. Most programs from that era are still in use, although many were scaled back during the 1990s as government priorities shifted towards reducing debt and deficits.

=== China ===
Welfare in the People's Republic of China is linked to the hukou system of household registration. Those holding non-agricultural hukou status have access to a number of programs provided by the government, such as healthcare, employment, retirement pensions, housing, and education. While rural residents traditionally were expected to provide for themselves, in 2014, the Chinese Communist Party announced reforms aimed at providing rural citizens access to historically urban social programs.

=== Czech Republic ===
Social welfare in Czech Republic is outlined in a series of social policies, as is the tradition in Europe. Their goal is primarily preventing, but also mitigating social situations individuals may find themselves in through their lives. The social welfare is provided through social (including pension) insurance, sick insurance (not to be confused with health insurance), public policy related to unemployment and low income benefits, which are financed through the government budget, and health insurance, which is financed through an array of insurance companies. Therefore, the social welfare program is usually separated into three categories: health insurance, social insurance and social benefits support.

Social insurance is a type of statutory insurance that provides citizens for a future unforeseen social event, such as unemployment or disability that would prevent an individual from working, but also planned retirement. Social insurance is therefore compulsory for all self-employed individuals, employees and employers operating in the Czech Republic and gets deducted from a salary in a similar manner to taxes. This insurance serves to finance unemployment support, disability benefits and covers a part of an employer's salary in cases of long-term illness that obstructs them from participating in the workforce.

The sickness insurance system is intended for gainfully employed individuals who, in cases of short-term social events, are provided with health insurance benefits. These are provided through financial benefits. Sickness insurance participants are employees and self-employed individuals. Employees are compulsorily covered by sickness insurance, unlike the self-employed, whose sickness insurance is voluntary (and there is no penalisation for opting out of the insurance). It is calculated through a series of reductions of an assessment base. Employees' sickness insurance provides 4 types of sickness benefits: benefits for caring for a family member, pregnancy and maternity allowance, maternity allowance. It is standard to go on paid maternity leave in the Czech Republic, which ordinarily lasts 28 weeks. This period is prolonged to 37 weeks in the case of twins. Furthermore, there are special circumstances, such as the birth of a disabled child, when this period is extended even more. The beginning of maternity leave is usually 6 weeks before expected due date, and after maternity leave, it is possible to request further parental leave, which is optional and can be performed by either parent, regardless of gender. Parental leave lasts up to four years, depending on individual preferences.

Pension insurance is part of social insurance, in addition to sickness insurance and serves as a contribution to the state employment policy. It is a premium for old age retirement, disability retirement or benefits in the event of the death of the primary provider in a household. Participation in pension insurance is mandatory for economically active individuals. For those on various forms of benefits, or currently registered as a care provider, this insurance is provided by the state. The basic pension insurance provides, in time old-age pension (includes regular, proportional, early and other variants of old-age pension), disability benefits, widower's and orphan's pension. Pension insurance is applied for at the District Social Security Administration in the applicant's place of permanent residence. They can apply in person or by proxy, on the basis of a notarized power of attorney. The amount of the pension consists of two component – the basic acreage and the percentage acreage.

Another form of pension is the disability pension. This is provided to individuals that are unable to participate in the workforce to the same degree as their able-bodied counterparts, due to their disability contributing to the decline of their ability to work (be it partially or entirely). There is a distinction between disability pension for individuals with first, second and third degree disability. The amount of the pension depends on the rate of decline of the person's ability to work, with the categories being divided between the first degree (a decrease of 35–49%), the second degree (a decrease of 50–69%), and the third degree (a decrease of 70% and above).

Furthermore, there is a so-called widow's / widower's pension. Provided to widowed individuals from the Czech pension system, its aim is to compensate households for losing income that they would in this situation be lacking. The widowed individual is entitled to a pension from a deceased person who has received an old-age or disability pension or has fulfilled the statutory condition on the required insurance period at the date of death. The amount of the assessment is 10% of the average wage and the amount of the percentage assessment is 50% of the percentage of the old-age or disability pension to which the deceased was entitled at the time of their death.

=== Denmark ===
Danish welfare is handled by the state through a series of policies (and the like) that seeks to provide welfare services to citizens, hence the term welfare state. This refers not only to social benefits, but also tax-funded education, public child care, medical care, etc. A number of these services are not provided by the state directly, but administered by municipalities, regions or private providers through outsourcing. This sometimes gives a source of tension between the state and municipalities, as there is not always consistency between the promises of welfare provided by the state (i.e. parliament) and local perception of what it would cost to fulfill these promises.

=== Estonia ===
Estonia does have a welfare state that provides a range of social services and financial assistance to its citizens. The Estonian welfare state is a liberal welfare state, which means that it provides a minimal safety net for citizens in need and places a greater emphasis on individual responsibility and self-sufficiency. The Estonian welfare state provides a range of services, including universal healthcare, free education, and a comprehensive system of social security. It also provides financial assistance to citizens in need through programs such as unemployment benefits, housing assistance, and social assistance for low-income families. The Estonian welfare state is funded through a mix of taxation and public spending, and it relies on a strong social security system to provide support to citizens in need. However, compared to other welfare states, it has relatively low levels of social spending and may rely more on private sector solutions to address social welfare issues.

=== Finland ===
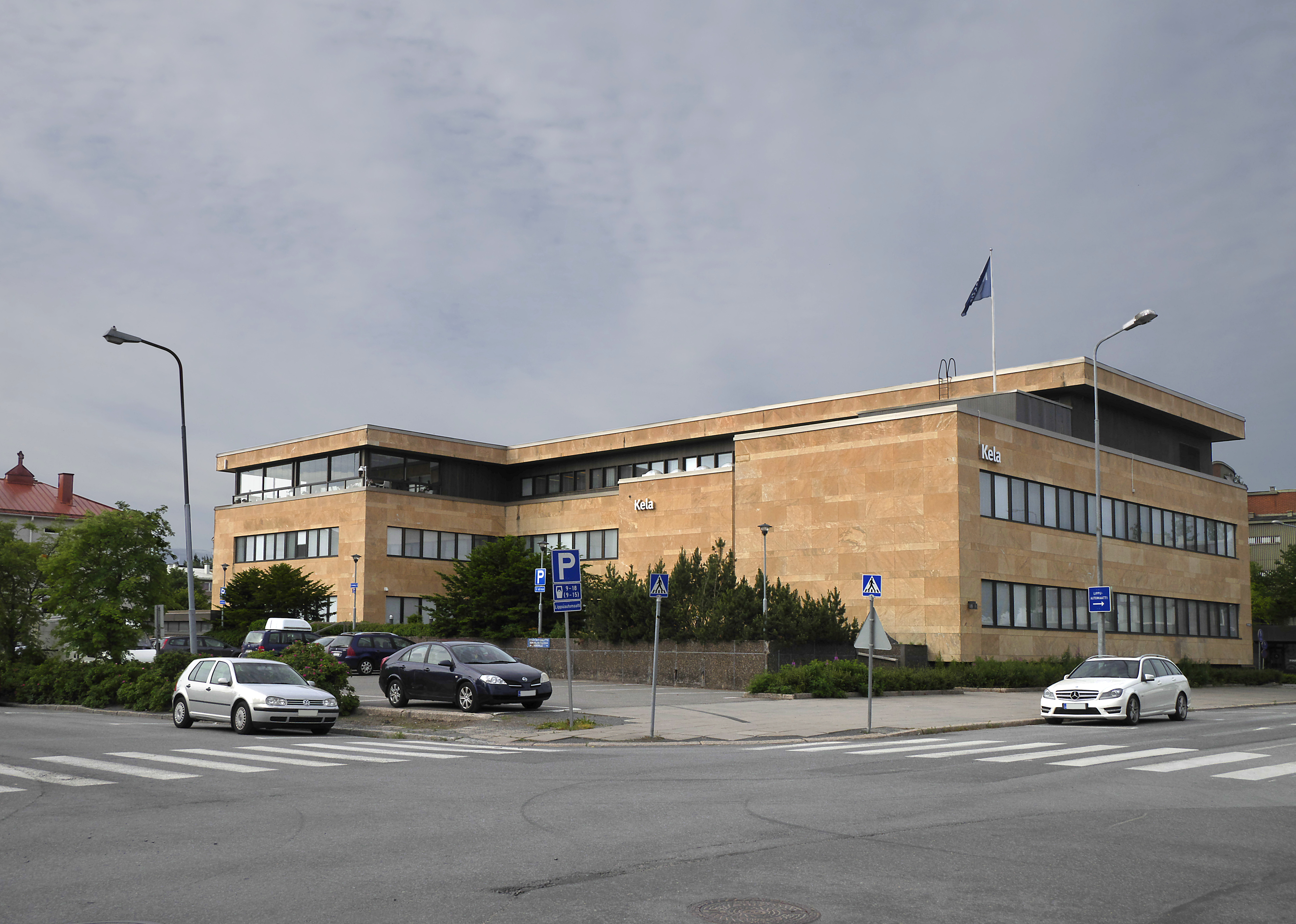
An office of the Social Insurance Institution (KELA) in Seinäjoki, Finland

The Finnish Nordic model welfare state is based on the principles of social equality and the belief that all citizens should have access to the same basic rights and opportunities. It provides a range of services, including universal healthcare, free education, and a comprehensive system of social security. It also provides financial assistance to citizens in need through programs such as unemployment benefits, housing assistance, and social assistance for low-income families. The Finnish welfare state relies on a strong social security system to provide support to citizens in need. It also places a strong emphasis on promoting social cohesion and reducing income inequality, and it has a relatively high level of social spending compared to other countries.

=== France ===
Solidarity is a strong value of the French Social Protection system. The first article of the French Code of Social Security describes the principle of solidarity. Solidarity is commonly comprehended in relations of similar work, shared responsibility and common risks. Existing solidarities in France caused the expansion of health and social security.

=== Germany ===
The welfare state has a long tradition in Germany dating to the Industrial Revolution. Due to the pressure of the workers' movement in the late 19th century, Reichskanzler Otto von Bismarck introduced the first rudimentary state social insurance scheme. Under Adolf Hitler, the National Socialist Program stated "We demand an expansion on a large scale of old age welfare." Today, the social protection of all its citizens is considered a central pillar of German national policy. 27.6 percent of Germany's GDP is channeled into an all-embracing system of health, pension, accident, longterm care and unemployment insurance, compared to 16.2 percent in the US. In addition, there are tax-financed services such as child benefits (Kindergeld, beginning at €192 per month for the first and second child, €198 for the third and €223 for each child thereafter, until they attain 25 years or receive their first professional qualification), and basic provisions for those unable to work or anyone with an income below the poverty line.

Since 2005, reception of full unemployment pay (60–67% of the previous net salary) has been restricted to 12 months in general and 18 months for those over 55. This is now followed by (usually much lower) Arbeitslosengeld II (ALG II) or Sozialhilfe, which is independent of previous employment (Hartz IV concept).

As of 2022, under ALG II, single adults receive up to €449 per month plus the cost of 'adequate' housing. ALG II can also be paid partially to employed persons to supplement a low work income.

=== India ===
The Directive Principles of India, enshrined in part IV of the Indian Constitution, reflect that India is a welfare state. The National Food Security Act, 2013 aims to guarantee right to food to all citizens. The welfare system was fragmented until the passing of The Code on Social Security, 2020, which standardised most of the programmes.

The Government of India's social programmes and welfare expenditures are a substantial portion of the official budget, and state and local governments play roles in developing and implementing social security policies. Additional welfare measure systems are also uniquely operated by various state governments. The government uses the Aadhaar system to distribute welfare measures in India. Some of the social programmes undertaken by the government are:

- Direct cash transfers for the poor.
- Financial inclusion of all individuals.
- Statutory insurances for health and accidents
- Free school meals
- Rural employment guarantee
- Various subsidies & benefits
- Pensions & provident funds

As of 2023, the government's expenditure on social programme and welfare was approximately ₹21.3 lakh crore (equivalent to ₹23 trillion or US$250 billion in 2026), which was 8.3% of gross domestic product (GDP). In 2020, the expenditure was ₹17.1 lakh crore (equivalent to ₹22 trillion or US$230 billion in 2026), accounting for 7.7% of GDP.

=== Israel ===
The Israeli government spend 86 billion NIS ($22.8 billion) in 2014. They are administered by the Ministry of Social Affairs and Social Services, and by Israel's national social security agency, Bituah Leumi. Social security schemes include pensions for the elderly and the disabled, unemployment benefits, and income support for low income households. All residents of Israel must pay insurance contributions to qualify for welfare.

=== Italy ===
The Italian welfare state's foundations were laid along the lines of the corporatist-conservative model, or of its Mediterranean variant. Later, in the 1960s and 1970s, increases in public spending and a major focus on universality brought it on the same path as social-democratic systems. In 1978, a universalistic welfare model was introduced in Italy, offering a number of universal and free services such as a National Health Fund.

=== Japan ===
Social welfare, assistance for the ill or otherwise disabled and for the old, has long been provided in Japan by both the government and private companies. Beginning in the 1920s, the government enacted a series of welfare programs, based mainly on European models, to provide medical care and financial support. During the postwar period, a comprehensive system of social security was gradually established.

=== Latin America ===
==== History ====
The 1980s marked a change in the structure of Latin American social protection programs. Social protection embraces three major areas: social insurance, financed by workers and employers; social assistance to the population's poorest, financed by the state; and labor market regulations to protect worker rights. Although diverse, recent Latin American social policy has tended to concentrate on social assistance.

The 1980s, had a significant effect on social protection policies. Prior to the 1980s, most Latin American countries focused on social insurance policies involving formal sector workers, assuming that the informal sector would disappear with economic development. The economic crisis of the 1980s and the liberalization of the labor market led to a growing informal sector and a rapid increase in poverty and inequality. Latin American countries did not have the institutions and funds to properly handle such a crisis, both due to the structure of the social security system, and to the previously implemented structural adjustment policies (SAPs) that had decreased the size of the state.

New Welfare programs have integrated the multidimensional, social risk management, and capabilities approaches into poverty alleviation. They focus on income transfers and service provisions while aiming to alleviate both long- and short-term poverty through, among other things, education, health, security, and housing. Unlike previous programs that targeted the working class, new programs have successfully focused on locating and targeting the very poorest.

The impacts of social assistance programs vary between countries, and many programs have yet to be fully evaluated. According to Barrientos and Santibanez, the programs have been more successful in increasing investment in human capital than in bringing households above the poverty line. Challenges still exist, including the extreme inequality levels and the mass scale of poverty; locating a financial basis for programs; and deciding on exit strategies or on the long-term establishment of programs.

==== 1980s impacts ====
The economic crisis of the 1980s led to a shift in social policies, as understandings of poverty and social programs evolved (24). New, mostly short-term programs emerged. These include:

- Argentina: Jefes y Jefas de Hogar, Asignación Universal por Hijo
- Bolivia: Bonosol
- Brazil: Bolsa Escola and Bolsa Familia
- Chile: Chile Solidario
- Colombia: Solidaridad por Colombia
- Ecuador: Bono de Desarrollo Humano
- Honduras: Red Solidaria
- Mexico: Prospera (earlier known as Oportunidades)
- Panama: Red de Oportunidades
- Peru: Juntos

==== Major aspects of current social assistance programs ====
- Conditional cash transfer (CCT) combined with service provisions. Transfer cash directly to households, most often through the women of the household, if certain conditions are met (e.g. children's school attendance or doctor visits) (10). Providing free schooling or healthcare is often not sufficient, because there is an opportunity cost for the parents in, for example, sending children to school (lost labor power), or in paying for the transportation costs of getting to a health clinic.
- Household. The household has been the focal point of social assistance programs.
- Target the poorest. Recent programs have been more successful than past ones in targeting the poorest. Previous programs often targeted the working class.
- Multidimensional. Programs have attempted to address many dimensions of poverty at once. Chile Solidario is the best example.

=== New Zealand ===
New Zealand is often regarded as having one of the first comprehensive welfare systems in the world. During the 1890s, a Liberal government adopted many social programmes to help the poor who had suffered from a long economic depression in the 1880s. One of the most far reaching was the passing of tax legislation that made it difficult for wealthy sheep farmers to hold onto their large land holdings. This and the invention of refrigeration led to a farming revolution where many sheep farms were broken up and sold to become smaller dairy farms. This enabled thousands of new farmers to buy land and develop a new and vigorous industry that has become the backbone of New Zealand's economy to this day. This liberal tradition flourished with increased enfranchisement for indigenous Māori in the 1880s and women. Pensions for the elderly, the poor and war casualties followed, with State-run schools, hospitals and subsidized medical and dental care. By 1960, New Zealand was able to afford one of the best-developed and most comprehensive welfare systems in the world, supported by a well-developed and stable economy.

=== Norway ===
Norway has a strong welfare state that provides a range of social services and financial assistance to its citizens. The Norwegian welfare state is based on the principles of social democracy, which means that it has a strong focus on reducing income inequality and promoting social cohesion. The Norwegian welfare state provides a range of services, including universal healthcare, free education, and a comprehensive system of social security. It also provides financial assistance to citizens in need through programs such as unemployment benefits, housing assistance, and social assistance for low-income families.

=== Philippines ===
In Philippines, social welfare is mainly provided by the Department of Social Welfare and Development (DSWD). DSWD provides social welfare such as cash assistance (ayuda) and physical goods. The Pantawid Pamilyang Pilipino Program is one of the most well known social welfare programs by the DSWD where cash grants are given to parents and guardians in poverty to help their children continue schooling. This has assisted parents and guardians in poverty by helping them buy food and school supplies for their dependents. The Sustainable Livelihood Program (SLP) is also another social welfare program where the DSWD provides education, cash grants, or items such as vehicles and food stalls to individuals and communities to aid in their livelihoods. SLP grants are given to individuals such as street food vendors and organisations such as farmers cooperatives. DSWD also provides medical assistance for those who cannot afford the out-of-pocket cost of hospitalisation as Philhealth's coverage usually does not cover the full expense. Other government agencies and companies also provide social welfare such as the Philippine Charity Sweepstakes Office, Department of Health, and offices of house representatives in their respective congressional districts.

=== Poland ===
The Polish welfare state provides a range of services, including universal healthcare, free education, and a comprehensive system of social security, such as 13th pension and 14th pension. It also provides financial assistance to citizens in need through programs such as unemployment benefits, housing assistance, and social assistance for low-income families, for example Rodzina 800 plus programme. It has undergone significant changes in recent years, including the implementation of structural reforms and the introduction of market-oriented policies, which have had an impact on the level and quality of social services provided.

=== Sri Lanka ===
Sri Lanka has a long history of social programmes dating back to its ancient times, deep-rooted in the island's Buddhist culture. Modern social welfare legislation dates back to the Donoughmore Constitution.

=== South Korea ===
South Korean social security system and welfare is based on the right to social security stipulated in the Constitution of the Republic of Korea and the social security-related laws based on this right. The country divides its social security system into three main systems: social insurance, social assistance, and social welfare services.

Employment insurance began in 1995 and became applicable to all workers in 1998, with contributions split equally between employers and insured workers.

=== Spain ===
Welfare in Spain is characterized by a Mediterranean Welfare state model based on three pillars: education, health, and pensions. As in most European countries, in Spain the Welfare State is a great achievement for its society since the State guarantees protection to all people who may find themselves in a situation of economic difficulty or any other. The social policies implemented by the Spanish State, as in the rest of Europe, are a set of measures and tools aimed at protecting and ensuring basic human needs, especially in the field of education, health, and economic security.

The Mediterranean Welfare state model is found not only in Spain, but also in countries such as Italy, Greece and Portugal, countries in the Mediterranean region where social protection arrived late, in the 70s and 80s of the 20th century. It is a model that mixes elements of the liberal (or Anglo-Saxon) and continental (or Bismarckian) welfare state. It is characterized as the welfare model with the lowest spending, with little investment in social assistance, a more fragmented social security system, and high spending on pensions, making pension benefits greater than unemployment benefits. One of the most particular features of the Mediterranean model is the large role of the family, which combines with the market and the state in the provision of welfare. Thus, the state assumes that the family covers certain services (such as childcare or care for the elderly), which in other models would be covered by the state. As for the labor market, it is characterized by high employment protection, the persistence of gender biases and a lower dispersion of workers' wages due to the importance of trade unions in negotiations.

The Spanish social welfare program can be separated into three categories or fundamental pillars: education, health, and pension system, as established in the Spanish Constitution ratified on December 29, 1978. It relies especially on Article 27 on education, Article 41 on the social security system and Article 50 on the pension system.

The beginnings of the Spanish Welfare state date back to the last decade of dictatorship, Francoist Spain, when it began to develop through the Social Security Law of 1963. Later, after the death of the dictator Francisco Franco and with the arrival of democracy, it would be when the existence of public needs not covered by the State became evident, and when education, health and social services were universalized. This advance of the welfare state was also marked by the economic crisis, which led to a deterioration of the labor market and highlighted the need to increase public spending to offer greater protection to the retired and unemployed.

Social policies in Spain constitute a set of legislation, decisions and activities that seek to promote the welfare of all Spaniards and improve their quality of life, facilitating access to society's goods and resources to cover their basic needs and respond to complex situations that citizens may face. These policies are governed by the principles of equality and equity. The social policies of the Spanish State, like those of most countries in the world, are in line with the UN Sustainable Development Goals, and, as the rest of the European Welfare States, also depend on the guidelines of a higher body, the European Union.

Among these policies are those oriented towards healthcare, social welfare policies to prevent and end poverty, free education, social security policies, security and justice policies or access to housing. Free public health care policies are aimed at improving people's living conditions and provide the medical and pharmaceutical services necessary to protect and restore the health of the insured. Health care is one of the benefits universally recognized for all citizens.

Education is another of the pillars of Spanish welfare. Educational policies are focused on guaranteeing access to the entire population, without any kind of discrimination, to free and compulsory general basic education from the age of 6 to 16. After that, citizens can also have free access to high school and vocational training. University studies, although not free, are also financed by the Spanish State. The educational model has a decentralized character and the competences, functions, services, and resources in the field of education have been transferred from the central government to the different Spanish autonomous communities in both university and non-university matters.

Finally, the third pillar of the Spanish welfare state is the pension system. The Spanish pension system includes a wide variety of pensions including widow's pensions, contributory pensions, and non-contributory pensions. The widow's pension covers people who suffer the death of their spouse. Contributory pensions are transfers from the state that depend on the worker's previous contribution and vary according to the number of years worked and the worker's contribution. Non-contributory pensions, on the other hand, have a welfare character and cover people for disability or retirement (if they have not contributed enough to qualify for a contributory pension). This public pension model is often supported by a private dimension formed by pension plans to which workers contribute a percentage of their salary during their working life, to receive a larger pension during their retirement.

In Spain, the welfare state is considered to be very scarce and less developed, especially compared to the European Union average, where social policies and the welfare state are strongly developed. Spain lags behind EU values in social protection spending measured both as a percentage of GDP and in absolute terms and in the proportion of adults working in state services. However, public spending in general, compared to the rest of the world, is very high. Moreover, the Spanish welfare state is polarized, which means that the higher income groups use private services (especially in health and education), while the lower income groups use public services.

The Spanish state's low investment in public spending affects the quality of its services. As for healthcare, almost all healthcare competencies have been transferred from the State to the Autonomous Communities. Public health spending is below the average of the European Union, in 2020 it was around 8% of GDP or €1907 per capita, while the European Union average stood at €2,244 per capita. It is even more worrying when the spending figure is separated between what is invested in healthcare as such and what is invested in the pharmaceutical industry. This ends up causing a great lack of resources and deficiencies in the Spanish healthcare system, such as long waiting lists, even for life-threatening operations, scarce primary care, etc. These deficiencies have accentuated the polarization of the Welfare State and have made the private sector acquire great importance in Spanish healthcare, becoming more similar to the healthcare systems in Latin America than in Europe.

Education is another of the pillars that support the Spanish Welfare state, but it also has a polarizing character in society. The low state investment in public education has led to an increase in the number of private and charter schools that have greater resources and create inequality in basic compulsory education.

=== Sweden ===
Social welfare in Sweden is made up of several organizations and systems dealing with welfare. It is mostly funded by taxes, and executed by the public sector on all levels of government as well as private organizations. It can be separated into three parts falling under three different ministries; social welfare, falling under the responsibility of Ministry of Health and Social Affairs; education, under the responsibility of the Ministry of Education and Research and labor market, under the responsibility of Ministry of Employment.

Government pension payments are financed through an 18.5% pension tax on all taxed incomes in the country, which comes partly from a tax category called a public pension fee (7% on gross income), and 30% of a tax category called employer fees on salaries (which is 33% on a netted income). Since January 2001, the 18.5% is divided in two parts: 16% goes to current payments, and 2.5% goes into individual retirement accounts, which were introduced in 2001. Money saved and invested in government funds, and IRAs for future pension costs, are roughly five times annual government pension expenses (725/150).

Viewing Swedish welfare more broadly, it emerges as highly rated in many standard international comparisons of welfare or well-being (e.g. World Economic Forum 2020). However, some Nordic-based welfare and gender researchers have argued that such assessments, based on conventional welfare/well-being criteria, may to some extent over-privilege Sweden (and other Nordic countries) in terms of, for instance, gender and racial equality. For example, they suggest that if one takes a broader perspective on well-being incorporating issues associated with bodily integrity or bodily citizenship (Pringle 2011), then some major forms of men's domination and/or white privilege can be seen to still stubbornly persist in the Nordic countries, e.g. business, violence to women, sexual violence to children, the military, academia and religion (Hearn and Pringle 2006; Hearn et al. 2018; Pringle 2016).

=== United Kingdom ===
UK Government welfare expenditure 2011–12

- State pension (46.32%)
- Housing Benefit (10.55%)
- Disability Living Allowance (7.87%)
- Pension Credit (5.06%)
- Income Support (4.31%)
- Rent rebates (3.43%)
- Attendance Allowance (3.31%)
- Jobseeker's Allowance (3.06%)
- Incapacity Benefit (3.06%)
- Council Tax Benefit (3%)
- Other (10.03%)

The United Kingdom has a long history of poverty relief, notably including the English Poor laws which date back to 1536. After various reforms, which involved workhouses, the poor laws were eventually abolished and replaced with a modern system by laws such as the National Assistance Act 1948 (11 & 12 Geo. 6. c. 29).

In more recent times, comparing the Cameron–Clegg coalition's austerity measures with the Opposition's, the Financial Times commentator Martin Wolf commented that the "big shift from Labour ... is the cuts in welfare benefits." The government's austerity programme, which involves reduction in government policy, has been linked to a rise in food banks. A study published in the British Medical Journal in 2015 found that each one percentage point increase in the rate of Jobseeker's Allowance claimants sanctioned was associated with a 0.09 percentage point rise in food bank use. The austerity programme has faced opposition from disability rights groups for disproportionately affecting disabled people. The "bedroom tax" is an austerity measure that has attracted particular criticism, with activists arguing that two-thirds of council houses affected by the policy are occupied with a person with a disability.

=== United States ===
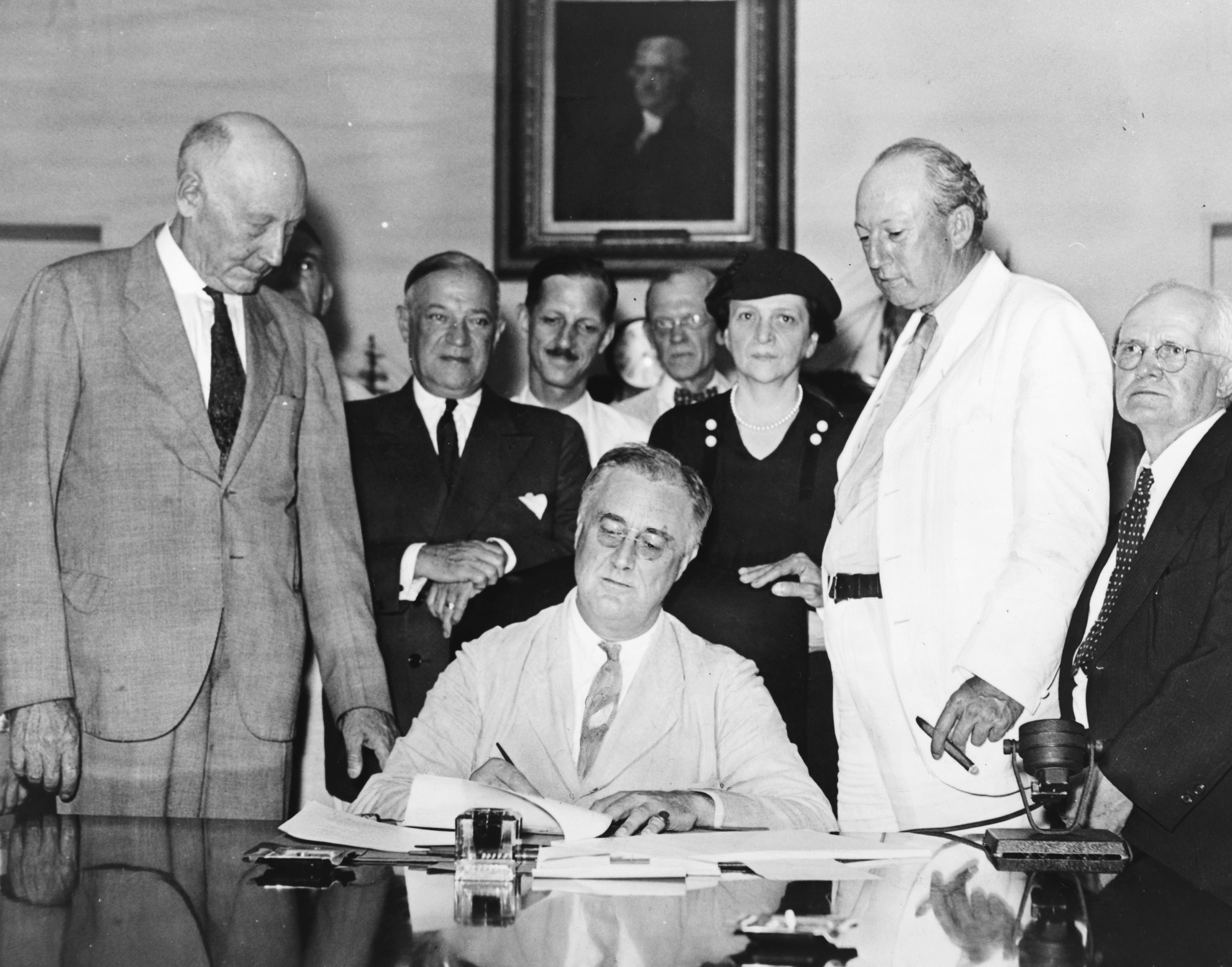
President Roosevelt signs the Social Security Act, 14 August 1935.

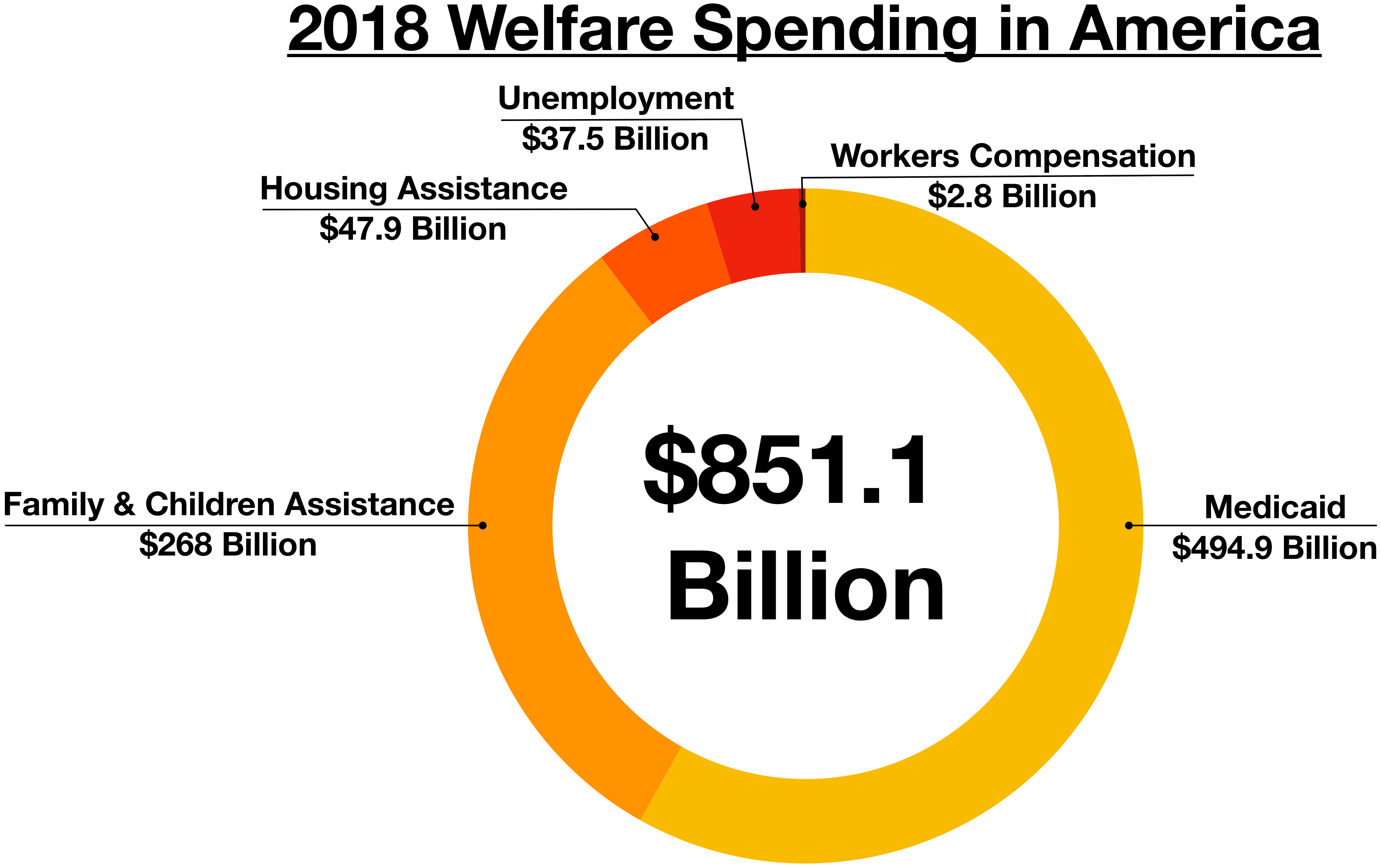
Welfare in America

In the United States, depending on the context, the term "welfare" can be used to refer to means-tested cash benefits, especially the Aid to Families with Dependent Children (AFDC) program and its successor, the Temporary Assistance for Needy Families block grants, or it can be used to refer to all means-tested programs that help individuals or families meet basic needs, including, for example, health care through Medicaid, Supplemental Security Income (SSI) benefits and food and nutrition programs (SNAP). It can also include social insurance programs such as unemployment insurance, Social Security, and Medicare.

AFDC (originally called Aid to Dependent Children) was created during the Great Depression to alleviate the burden of poverty for families with children and allow widowed mothers to maintain their households. The New Deal employment program such as the Works Progress Administration primarily served men. Prior to the New Deal, anti-poverty programs were primarily operated by private charities or state or local governments; however, these programs were overwhelmed by the depth of need during the Depression.

In 1964 Black people comprised about 27% of the people in photographs in the three weekly news magazines. By 1967 the proportion jumped to 72%. Causes of the shift were the civil rights movement and urban riots from the mid-1960s. Subsequently, news media portrayed stereotypes of black people as lazy and undeserving and as welfare queens. These shifts in media presentation did not necessarily reflect a decrease in the percentage of the population living in poverty.

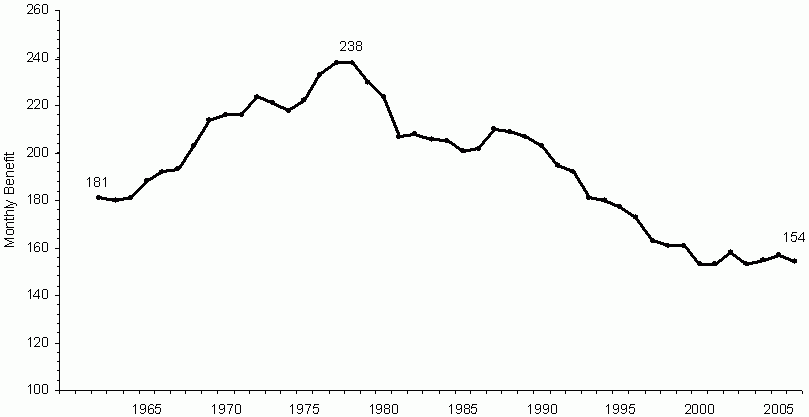
A chart showing the overall decline of average monthly welfare benefits (AFDC then TANF) per recipient 1962–2006 (in 2006 dollars)

In 1996, the Personal Responsibility and Work Opportunity Reconciliation Act changed the structure of Welfare payments and added new criteria to states that received Welfare funding. After reforms that President Clinton said would "end Welfare as we know it", amounts from the federal government were given out in a flat rate per state based on population. Each state must meet certain criteria to ensure recipients are being encouraged to work themselves out of Welfare. The new program is called Temporary Assistance for Needy Families (TANF). It encourages states to require some sort of employment search in exchange for providing funds to individuals, and imposes a five-year lifetime limit on cash assistance. In FY 2010, 31.8% of TANF families were White, 31.9% were African-American, and 30.0% were Hispanic.

According to the U.S. Census Bureau data released 13 September 2011, the nation's poverty rate rose to 15.1% (46.2 million) in 2010, up from 14.3% (approximately 43.6 million) in 2009 and to its highest level since 1993. In 2008, 13.2% (39.8 million) Americans lived in relative poverty.

In a 2011 op-ed in Forbes, Peter Ferrara stated that, "The best estimate of the cost of the 185 federal means tested Welfare programs for 2010 for the federal government alone is nearly $700 billion, up a third since 2008, according to the Heritage Foundation. Counting state spending, total Welfare spending for 2010 reached nearly $900 billion, up nearly one-fourth since 2008 (24.3%)." California, with 12% of the U.S. population, has one-third of the nation's welfare recipients.

The United States has also typically relied on charitable giving through non-profit agencies and fundraising instead of direct monetary assistance from the government itself. According to Giving USA, Americans gave $358.38 billion to charity in 2014. This is rewarded by the United States government through tax credits for individuals and companies that are not typically seen in other countries. Since these per capita charity sums are much higher than in all other countries, this means that private people and companies have a strong say in how social assistance is carried out. This means that public funds in the form of unpaid taxes are distributed according to less professional, less objective, and less unbiased criteria than in all other countries.

== Effects ==
The welfare-to-work intervention programme is unlikely to have any impacts on the mental and physical health of lone parents and children. Even when the employment and income rates were higher in this group of people, the poverty rate was high which could lead to persistently high rates of depression whether they were in the programme or not.

Income transfers can be either conditional or unconditional. Conditionalities are sometimes criticized as being paternalistic and unnecessary, and research in different contexts shows enforcing conditionalities can result in additional burdens for recipients and social service providers.

A 2008 study by welfare economist and Brown University Professor Allan M. Feldman suggests that welfare can achieve both competitive equilibrium and Pareto efficiency in the market, although different points of Pareto efficiency are more fair to some than others.

Some opponents of welfare argue that it affects work incentives.

== See also ==
- Basic income
- Contingencies fund
- Corporate welfare
- Democratic socialism
- Economic, social and cultural rights
- Financing and benefit structure
- Human Poverty Index
- Human security
- List of countries by Social Progress Index
- List of countries by social welfare spending
- Parental leave
- Poverty reduction
- Social democracy
- Social liberalism
- Social policy
- Social safety net
- Four Pillars (Geneva Association)
- Welfare economics
- Welfare fraud
- Welfare rights
- Welfare trap
- Workfare
- Welfarism

== Sources ==
- Blank, R.M (2001), "Welfare Programs, Economics of", International Encyclopedia of the Social & Behavioral Sciences, Elsevier, pp. 16426–16432, ISBN 978-0-08-043076-8
- Sheldon Danziger, Robert Haveman, and Robert Plotnick (1981). "How Income Transfer Programs Affect Work, Savings, and the Income Distribution: A Critical Review", Journal of Economic Literature 19(3), pp. 975–1028.
- Haveman, R.H (2001), "Poverty: Measurement and Analysis", International Encyclopedia of the Social & Behavioral Sciences, pp. 11917–11924, doi:10.1016/B0-08-043076-7/02276-2, ISBN 978-0-08-043076-8
- Steven N. Durlauf et al., ed. (2008) The New Palgrave Dictionary of Economics, 2nd Edition:

"social insurance" by Stefania Albanesi. Abstract.
"social insurance and public policy" by Jonathan Gruber Abstract.
"Welfare state" by Assar Lindbeck. Abstract.

- Premilla Nadasen, Jennifer Mittelstadt, and Marisa Chappell, Welfare in the United States: A History with Documents, 1935–1996. (New York: Routledge, 2009). 241 pp. ISBN 978-0-415-98979-4
- Samuel Lézé, "Welfare", in : Andrew Scull, J. (ed.), Cultural Sociology of Mental Illness, Sage, 2014, pp. 958–60
- Alfred de Grazia, with Ted Gurr: American Welfare, New York University Press, New York (1962)
  - Review by Barrett Lyons in Social Work Vol. 7 Issue 2, p. 112
- Alfred de Grazia, ed. Grass roots private welfare: winning essays of the 1956 national competition of the Foundation for voluntary Welfare, New York University Press, New York 1957.
