= Food stamp =

Food stamp may refer to:

- Supplemental Nutrition Assistance Program, current name for the former U.S. Food Stamp Program
- Ration stamp, used to ration goods, particularly in wartime
- Coupon for food
- Meal voucher
- Voucher
