= Upcoop =

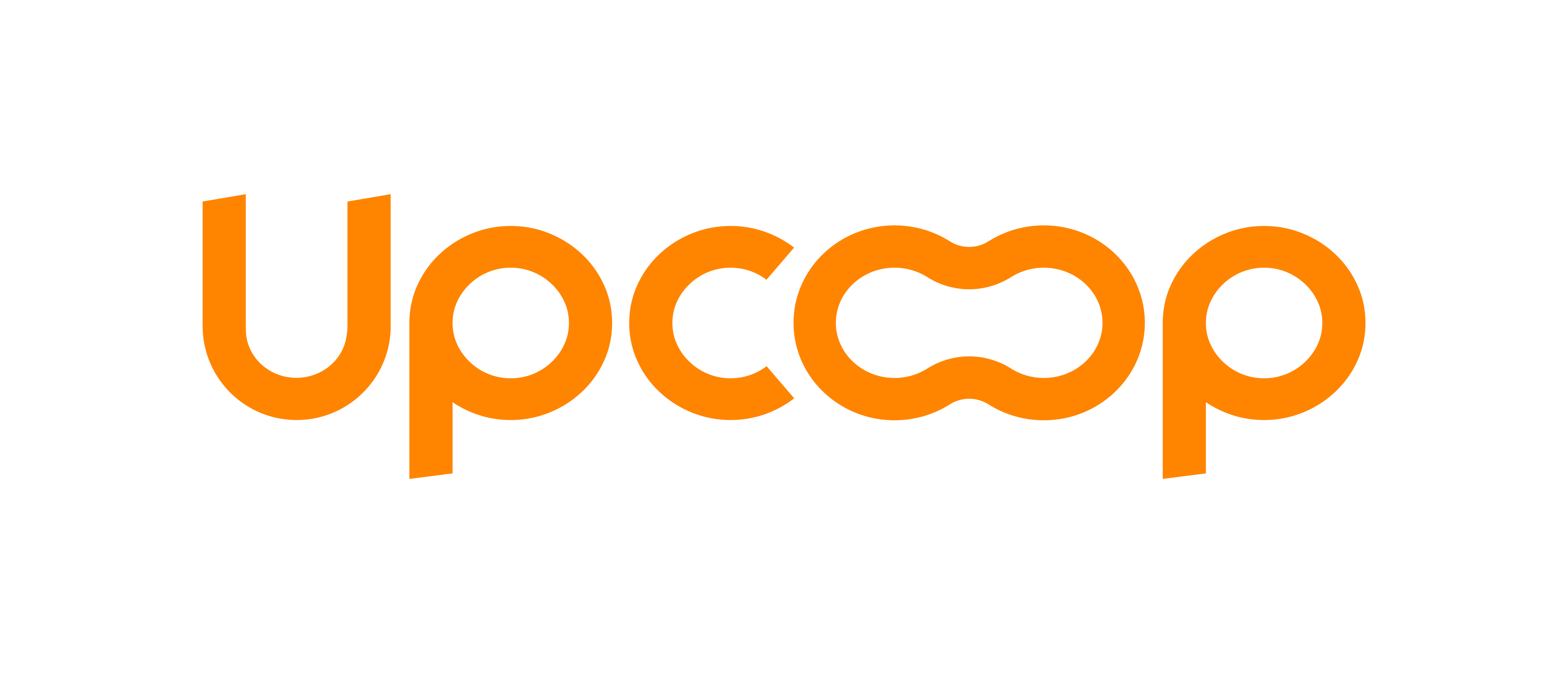
- Formerly: Groupe Chèque Déjeuner (1964–2015); Groupe Up (2015–2023)
- Company type: Société coopérative et participative (SCOP)
- Industry: Financial services
- Founded: January 1, 1964
- Headquarters: Gennevilliers, France
- Area served: Worldwide (26 countries)
- Key people: Youssef Achour (Chairman)
- Products: Meal vouchers (UpDéjeuner); Gift cards (UpCadhoc); Up Chèque Domicile; Chèque Lire
- Revenue: ▲€843 million (2024)
- Owner: 100% employee-owned
- Number of employees: 3,210 (2024)
- Subsidiaries: givve GmbH
- Website: groupe.up.coop/en/
- Footnotes / references France's first mission-driven cooperative (entreprise à mission)

Upcoop (formerly Groupe Chèque Déjeuner, then Groupe Up) is a French cooperative headquartered in Gennevilliers, near Paris. Founded in 1964, the company issues meal vouchers and gift cards for businesses and public authorities.

== Legal structure ==
Upcoop is a Société coopérative et participative (SCOP) with a share capital of €1,689,712. The company is 100% owned by its employee-members and has no external shareholders or investment funds. The cooperative heads a group of 88 entities. In January 2023, Upcoop became France's first mission-driven SCOP (entreprise à mission).

== Financial data ==
In 2024, the group reported consolidated revenue of €843 million and employs 3,210 people across 26 countries on 4 continents.

== Products ==
Upcoop issues meal vouchers (UpDéjeuner) and gift cards (UpCadhoc).

== International presence ==
Upcoop operates in 26 countries across Europe, the Americas, Africa and Asia, including Belgium, Brazil, Bulgaria, Czech Republic, Germany, Hungary, Italy, Mexico, Morocco, Poland, Portugal, Romania, Spain, Tunisia and Turkey.

The group first expanded internationally to Spain in 1992, then to Eastern Europe from 1995 onwards, and to Latin America with implantations in Mexico (2013) and Brazil (2015).

In August 2018, Upcoop acquired the Munich-based fintech company givve GmbH, a specialist in employee benefits and prepaid payment cards, for approximately €20 million. The transaction was advised by European corporate finance firm Clipperton.

Its main competitors include Sodexo and Edenred.
