= Wimpy (restaurant) =

Restaurant chain

- Formerly: Wimpy Grills, Wimpy Bar
- Type: Wholly owned subsidiary
- Industry: Restaurants
- Founded: 1934; 92 years ago in Bloomington, Indiana, US
- Founder: Edward Gold
- Headquarters: Johannesburg, South Africa
- Number of locations: 545 (2025)
- Areas served: South Africa; Namibia; United Kingdom; Kuwait; Egypt; Lesotho; United Arab Emirates; Botswana
- Products: Hamburgers, Chicken, French fries
- Parent: Famous Brands
- Website: wimpy.uk.com wimpy.co.za wimpy.me

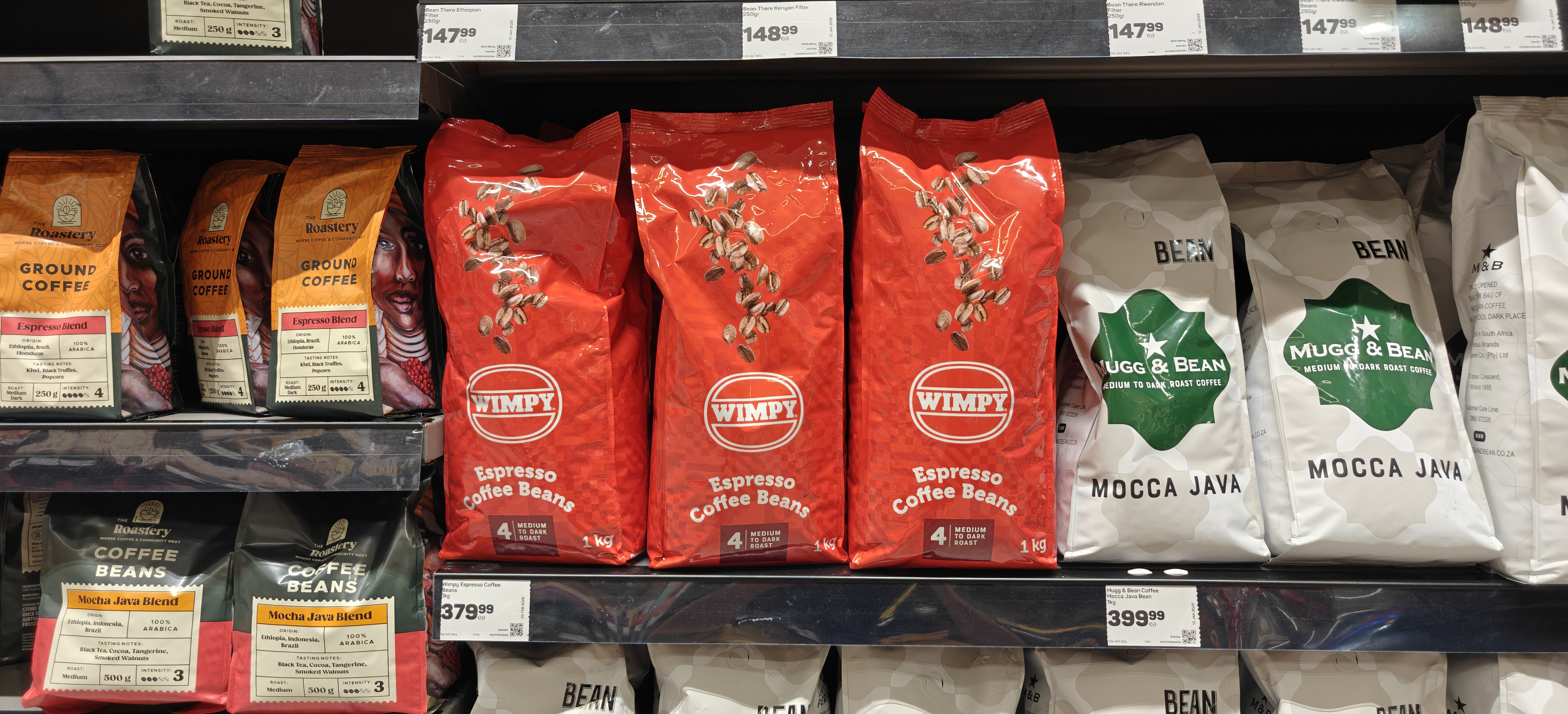
Wimpy coffee beans in a Pick n Pay store in Cape Town

Wimpy is a British fast-food casual dining chain that was founded in the United States. It found its success internationally, mainly in South Africa, and has changed between being a table-service establishment and counter-service establishment throughout its history.

The chain was founded in Bloomington, Indiana, by Edward Gold in 1934 as Wimpy Grills, with the chain in the United States hitting its peak with 26 locations in 1947. In 1954, Gold signed a license with J. Lyons and Co. for them to operate Wimpy Bar across the United Kingdom, with further international agreements a few years later through its subsidiary company, Wimpy International.

By 1977, there were only seven Wimpy locations in the United States, which all folded following Gold's death in that year. Despite the brand's demise domestically, the chain would peak at 1,500 international locations the following year.

The company was sold to United Biscuits in 1977, and then to Grand Metropolitan in 1989. Grand Metropolitan began to phase out the Wimpy Bar in the United Kingdom, rebranding many of them as Burger King (which it also owned) because Burger King had the greater brand recognition amongst consumers, and to aid market competition against McDonald's.

Following various buyouts, Wimpy was sold to South African restaurant and fast food conglomerate Famous Brands in 2007. Famous Brands had operated the South African Wimpy franchise for a number of years, and the acquisition made it the parent company.

As of June 2023, the company remains headquartered in Johannesburg, South Africa, where it has 453 outlets; this is followed by the United Kingdom with 61 outlets. In 2017 and 2020, the company announced plans for nationwide expansion in the United Kingdom. The company also operates locations in Kuwait, Egypt, the United Arab Emirates, Namibia, and Lesotho.

== History ==
=== Origins in the United States ===
The Wimpy brand was established in 1934 by Edward Gold, when he opened his first location in Bloomington, Indiana, under the name Wimpy Grills. The name was inspired by the character of J. Wellington Wimpy from the Popeye cartoons created by E. C. Segar. Gold did not open his first Chicago area location until two years later in 1936, after opening units in five other Midwestern cities. By 1947, the Chicago Tribune reported that the chain had 26 units, and expected to sell eight million hamburgers annually in the Chicago area.

According to a 1978 Chicago Tribune article, Gold's company Wimpy Grills Inc. of Chicago, had 25 locations in the United States at its peak, but only seven locations remained at the time of his death in 1977. The chain vanished within the United States after Gold's death because no one had purchased the rights and trademark to the Wimpy name from Gold's estate.

=== Wimpy's International ===
In 1954, Gold sold a licence to J. Lyons and Co. to use the Wimpy name in the United Kingdom. Wimpy Grills Inc. of Chicago later formed a joint company with Lyons called Wimpy's International Inc. in 1957. Wimpy's International was based in Chicago and allowed the brand to operate Wimpy Grills in the rest of the world.

The joint company eventually grew to 1,500 locations, with Gold later selling his share to Lyons prior to his death. After obtaining full control of the international licensing outside of the United States, Lyons and its successors handled global franchising through their United Kingdom-based subsidiary Wimpy International Ltd. This arrangement ceased when Wimpy UK became a subsidiary of the South Africa-based Famous Brands in 2007. The South African company started to handle worldwide franchising duties directly from Johannesburg.

=== United Kingdom ===
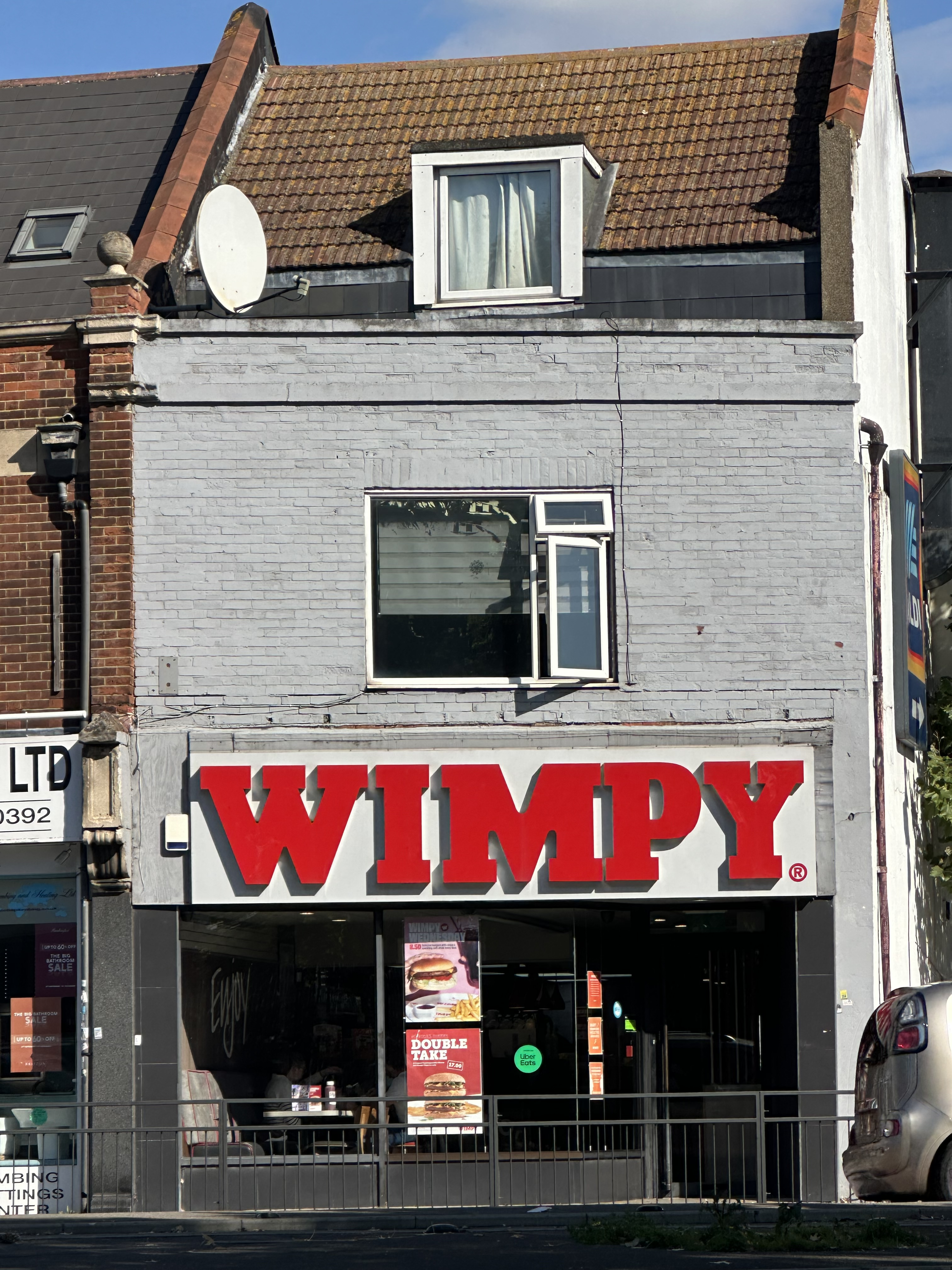
A Wimpy restaurant in Strood, Kent (October 2025)

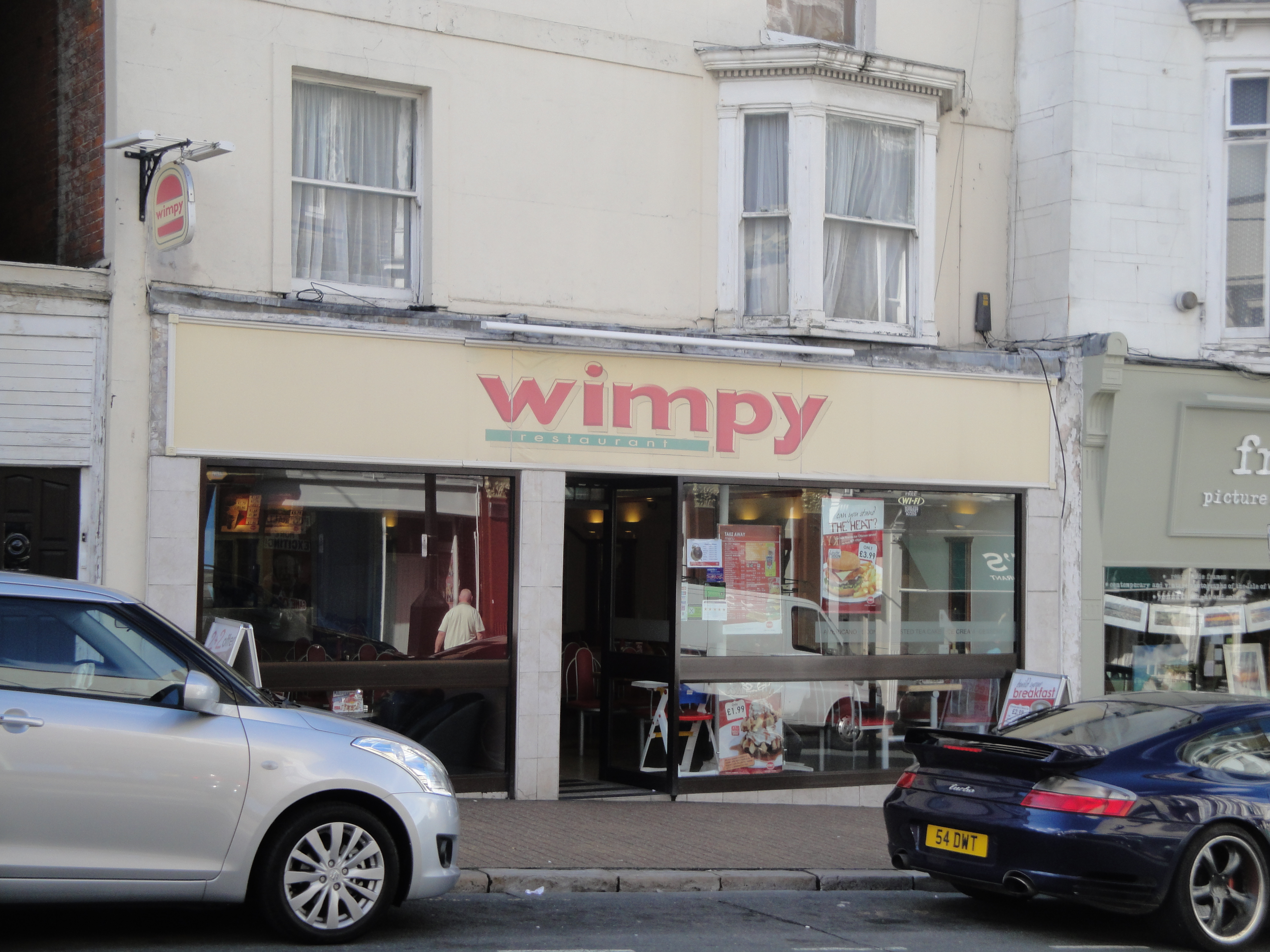
A Wimpy restaurant in Ryde, Isle of Wight (2011), with the previous logo

Lyons obtained a licence to use the Wimpy brand in the United Kingdom from Edward Gold's Chicago based Wimpy Grills Inc. and, in 1954, the first "Wimpy Bar" was established at the Lyons Corner House in Coventry Street, London. The bar began as a special fast food section within traditional Corner House restaurants, but the success soon led to the establishment of separate Wimpy restaurants serving only hamburger-based meals.

In a 1955 newspaper column, Art Buchwald, syndicated writer for the Washington Post, wrote about the recent opening of a "Wimpy's Hamburger Parlor" on Coventry Street and about the influence of American culture on the British.

Buchwald wrote, "Food served at the table within ten minutes of ordering and with atomic age efficiency. No cutlery needed or given. Drinks served in a bottle with a straw. Condiments in pre-packaged single serving packets." In addition to familiar Wimpy burgers and milkshakes, the British franchise served ham or sardine rolls called torpedoes and sandwiches called Freddies, which contained a cold frankfurter with pickled cucumber.

During the 1970s, Wimpy refused entry to women on their own after midnight. This may have been because of an assumption they might be prostitutes. A requirement not to allow thieves or prostitutes to assemble on the premises existed under the Late Night Refreshment Houses Act 1969.

By 1970, the business had expanded to over 1,000 restaurants in 23 countries.

In July 1977, the business was acquired by United Biscuits. In 1978, the long-running Mr Wimpy advertising character was introduced, starting in Brighton. The fast food chain coined its name from J. Wellington Wimpy in the Popeye cartoon strip, so used Mr Wimpy, an exaggerated beefeater figure, to advertise and promote their product, including employing people to wear Mr Wimpy suits outside the restaurants.

By the end of the 1980s, Wimpy was beginning to lose ground to McDonald's, which had opened its first restaurant in the country in 1974, and so the new management of Wimpy began to streamline the business, by converting some of the traditional table service restaurants to counter service. When United Biscuits decided to divest its restaurant division in 1989, it sold the business to Grand Metropolitan (now Diageo). At the time of the sale, there were 381 locations in the United Kingdom. Grand Metropolitan had acquired Burger King the previous year, and it began to convert the counter service restaurants to Burger King since it had a greater global brand recognition.

In February 1990, the remaining 216 table service restaurants were purchased by a management buyout, backed by 3i. These were locations that were considered less desirable by Grand Metropolitan. At the time of the buyout, there were also 140 franchised locations outside of the United Kingdom. In October 1999, Wimpy rolled out a chain of restaurants known as Dr. Beaks, to take on brands such as KFC.

A second management buyout occurred in May 2002, backed by the Bank of Scotland. At the time of the sale in 2002, there were approximately 300 locations in the United Kingdom and Ireland.

Although Wimpy outlets have decreased in numbers in the United Kingdom, they are still found in many towns and cities, including Huddersfield, and at seafront/seasonal locations, such as Felixstowe, Clacton-on-Sea, Clarence Pier in Southsea. By the beginning of the 21st century, most Wimpys were found in less desirable low-rent locations that primarily cater to pensioners and others on a fixed income, rather than the high street locations of former times. Another big change from earlier times was that most locations were now franchises and not company-owned operations.

On 27 February 2007, Famous Brands, which owns the Wimpy franchise in South Africa, announced that it had acquired Wimpy UK. Having acquired the brand, Famous Brands has rebranded Wimpy in the United Kingdom, to bring it in line with Wimpy South Africa. The "new" logo is the one that had been used by Wimpy UK from the 1960s until the 1980s. In November 2009, Famous Brands began to upgrade its 170 locations in the United Kingdom to resemble United States-style diners. As of January 2025, 61 restaurants remain in the United Kingdom.

==== IRA bombing ====
On 26 October 1981, Kenneth Howorth, an explosives officer with London's Metropolitan Police, was killed whilst attempting to defuse a bomb planted by the Provisional Irish Republican Army in the basement of Wimpy's in Oxford Street.

=== South Africa ===
Wimpy South Africa

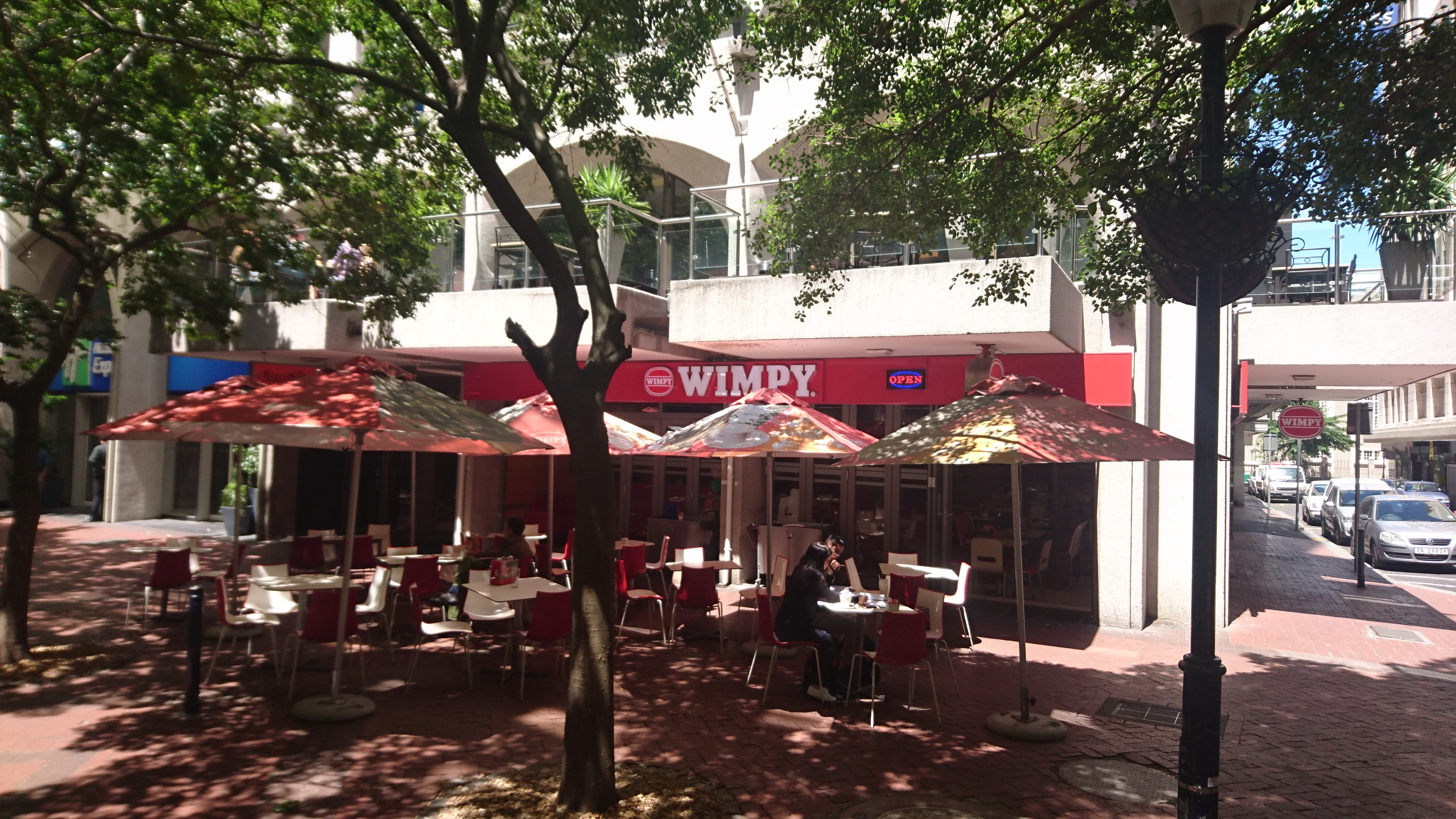
An outside view of a Wimpy franchise in Cape Town, South Africa (2016).

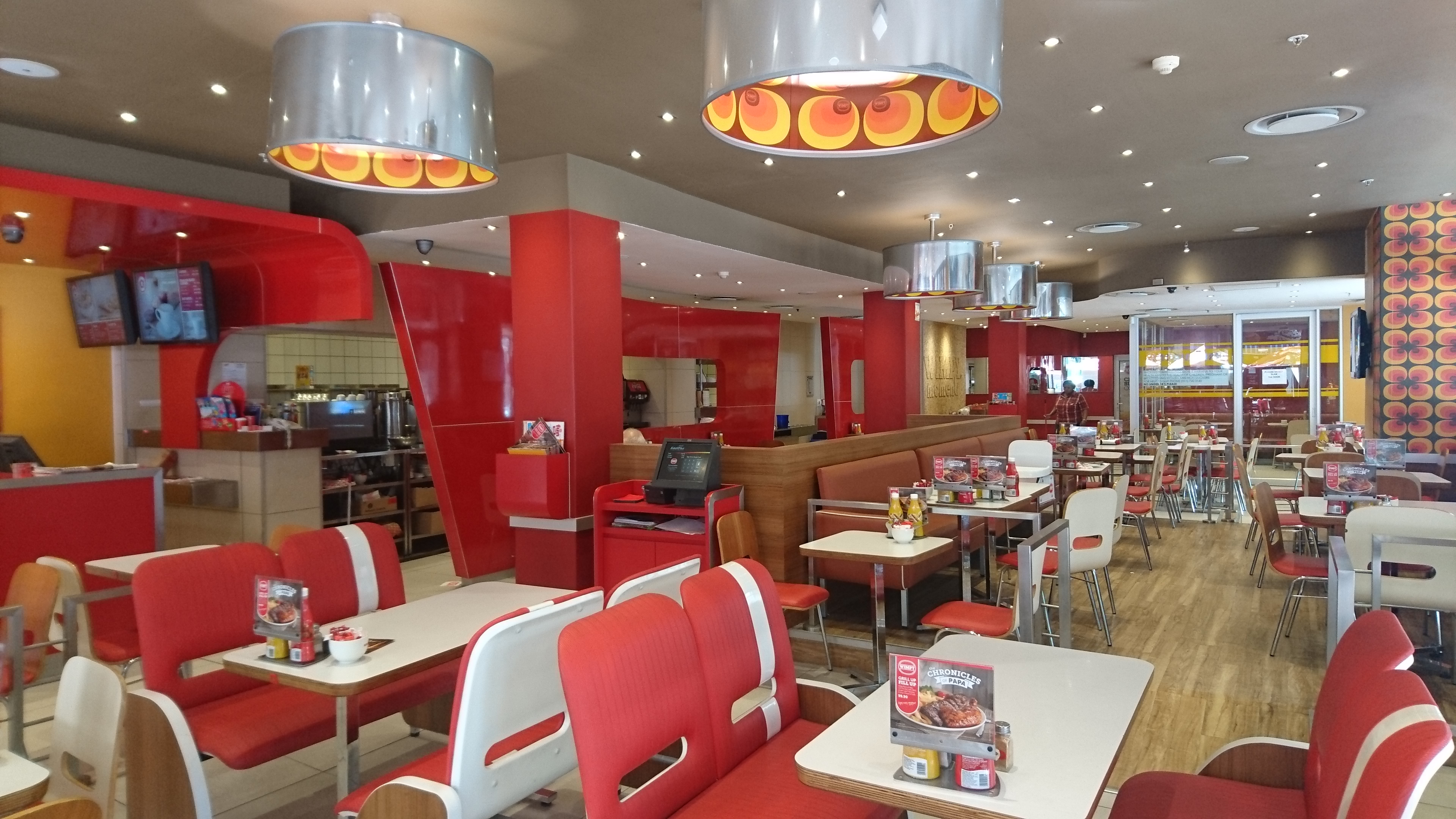
An interior view of a Wimpy in South Africa (2016). Note the distinctive US-style diner inspired design.

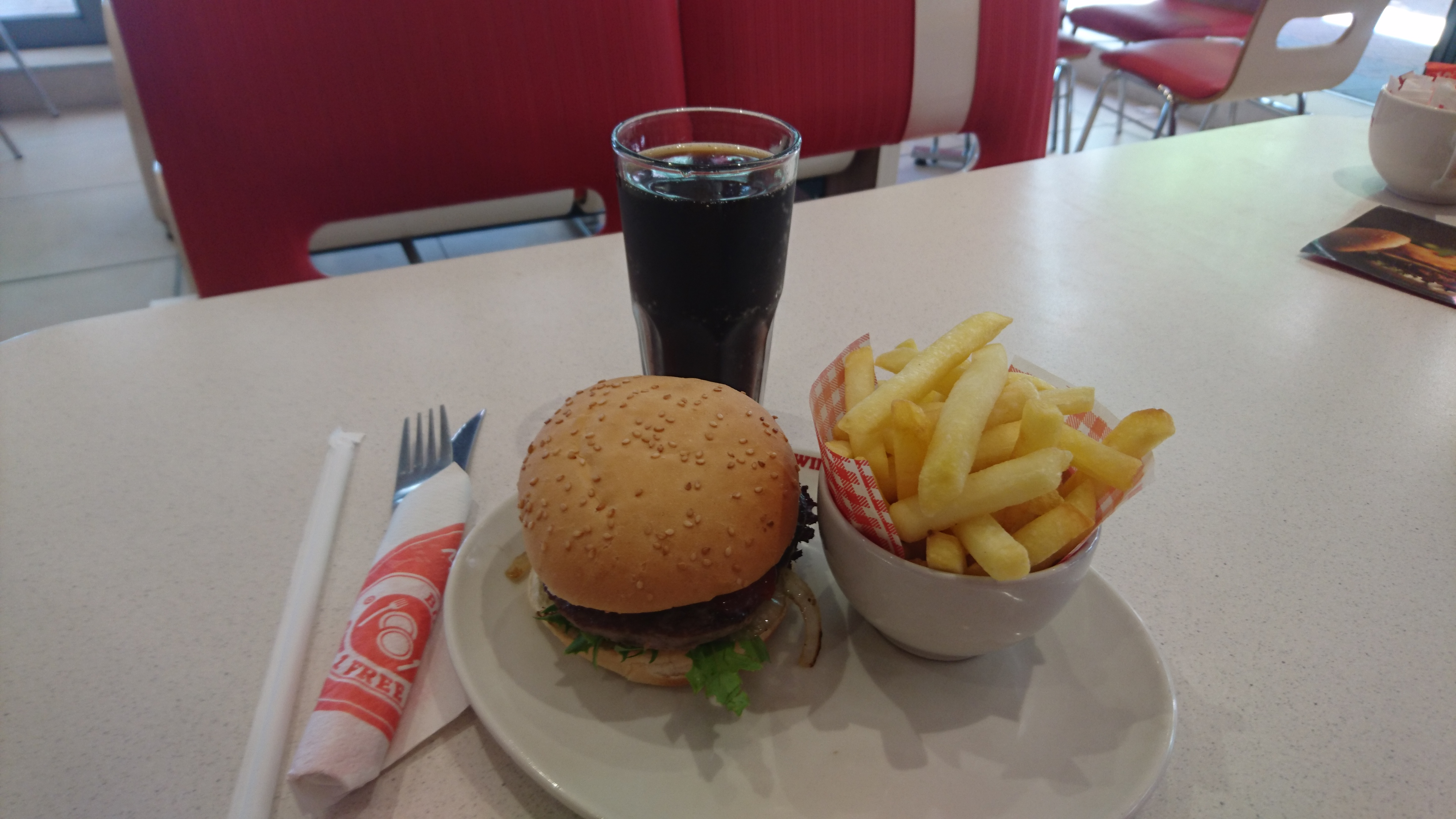
A typical Wimpy burger and chips with carbonated drink, including cutlery, from a South African Wimpy (2016).

Wimpy International opened its first South African location in Durban in 1967. The South African restaurants were sold to Bakers SA Ltd in the late 1970s, which in 1987 sold the South African chain to Pleasure Foods, then known as Juicy Lucy SA. Famous Brands Limited, then known as the Steers Holdings Limited, acquired Wimpy when it bought Pleasure Foods in 2003.

Famous Brands acquired the United Kingdom-based Wimpy in February 2007, thus becoming the parent company for the chain and beginning to collect the franchise fees from the other franchises.

As of February 2025, Famous Brands has 451 Wimpy restaurants in South Africa, making it the largest franchise in the Wimpy franchise system.

=== Lesotho ===
There is a Wimpy restaurant in Maseru, the capital of Lesotho.

=== Kuwait ===
Since 1970, the Americana Group has operated a single Wimpy restaurant within the Arab League nation of Kuwait. By January 2022, the chain expanded to three locations. As of November 2024, Americana Group has eight locations in Kuwait.

=== Egypt ===
During the late 1970s and 1980s there was a Wimpy restaurant in the Zamalek area of Cairo, but this subsequently closed. In 2021 the opening of a new Wimpy in Cairo was announced, and it opened on 30 June. As of November 2024, Americana Group has 16 locations within the Cairo region of Egypt.

=== United Arab Emirates ===
The Wimpy brand returned to the United Arab Emirates when Kuwait-based Americana Group opened three locations within the city of Abu Dhabi in December 2022. As of November 2024, there are 7 locations in the United Arab Emirates.

== Former locations ==
=== Europe ===
==== Finland ====
There were three franchise locations in the Finnish capital Helsinki between 1973 and 1977.

==== France ====
In May 1961, French businessman Jacques Borel opened his first Wimpy restaurant in Paris after obtaining an exclusive franchise to operate Wimpy restaurants in France. His restaurant was the first hamburger restaurant in France and predated the opening of the first McDonald's restaurant by a decade.

By the end of that year, he was able to open three more locations within Paris. By 1966, he began to expand outside the capital, starting with Lille. Within a short time, Borel had 20 locations; 15 in Paris and five in the rest of the country. Borel's company was so successful that the French newspaper France-Soir called the French franchise "public enemy number 1" for introducing American hamburger cuisine and fast food to French public at large. Although successful, Borel was forced to close the chain in 1969, owing to a disagreement he had with Lyons, the British parent company.

==== Ireland ====
Wimpy has been in Ireland on two occasions, in the 1960s and 1970s, and in the early 2000s. In the 2000s, petrol station chain operator Petrogas took on the master franchise for Ireland, and operated a large number of sites until 2010.

Most have been replaced by Grill'n'Fill own-branded areas – selling virtually identical products – or Burger King, for which Petrogas had obtained the franchise. Petrogas terminated its master franchise agreement with Wimpy International in 2010.

==== Netherlands ====
In 1963, the Dutch supermarket chain Albert Heijn obtained a licence from Chicago-based Wimpy International to open the first Wimpy restaurant in the Netherlands on Leidsestraat in Amsterdam. A second restaurant opened the following year on Damrak. The last Wimpy closed in Zandvoort in 1985. Albert Heijn ceased to mention Wimpy already in their corporate annual reports after 1969.

In 1971, Albert Heijn helped McDonald's to open its first restaurant in Europe by establishing a franchise in Zaandam. Wimpy International from London, owned by United Biscuits, opened two counter service restaurants, while Wimpy Benelux, a company owned by Wimpy International, opened one new restaurant in The Hague in 1978. A second Wimpy on Damrak was converted to counter service in 1979.

==== West Germany ====
Restaurateur Heinrich Lobenberg opened the first Wimpy restaurant in West Germany under a franchise licence from Wimpy International at the Bochum Hauptbahnhof in December 1964, exactly seven years before the first McDonald's in West Germany, with plans to open up to 300 units in West Germany. Lobenberg had co-founded the then five-unit Kochlöffel chain just three years before in Lingen.

There are no verifiable records showing that Lobenberg opened a second Wimpy unit or how long the Bochum restaurant operated before it closed. A food historian writing in 2014 believes that Wimpy's failure to survive in Cold War era West Germany was caused by West German consumers of the 1960s preferring to eat familiar German-style chicken meals at the local Wienerwald chain instead of getting an unfamiliar American-style hamburger sandwich at Wimpy. At that time, Wimpy "was regarded with mere curiosity".

=== Oceania ===
==== Australia ====
The Wimpy licence in Australia was held by Happysnaks Pty Ltd and was owned by restaurateur and entrepreneur Oliver Shaul. The first Wimpy bar opened in Sydney in November 1964, owned and operated directly by Happysnaks. Subsequent Wimpy bars operated as franchises.

By 1971, there were 70 Wimpy bars around Australia, the most successful being in Hindley Street, Adelaide. Unable to compete with McDonald's, the Wimpy brand was withdrawn in 1975 and most Wimpy bars became independent fast food outlets.

==== New Zealand ====
Wimpy had branches in New Zealand, including Rotorua, Auckland, Hamilton, Tauranga, Paraparaumu, Wanganui, Palmerston North, New Plymouth, Taupo, Napier and Wellington. These were all rebranded in 2002. One store remained in Rotorua trading as Wimpy, although it was not part of the franchise chain. The last Wimpy in New Zealand was put up for sale in May 2008.

=== Asia ===
==== Bangladesh ====
Wimpy had an outlet in Gulshan area of Dhaka in Bangladesh during the 1990s. It later closed down somewhere in mid 2000s.

==== India ====
Wimpy was one of the first fast food restaurant chains to open in India's free market economy. With a run of initial success, Wimpy was often touted as the first icon of 'Westernization' in India. A few of the restaurants which were still in business were located in Punjab until 2002.

==== Indonesia ====
It is unclear when Wimpy opened its first Indonesian location. But it was most likely to have expanded to Indonesia in the late 1980s under the Singaporean subsidiary. Their lone store in the Blok M district of Jakarta closed down in the late 1990s.

==== Israel ====
Wimpy entered the Israeli market in the 1960s, and for a time dominated the hamburger restaurant market. The Israeli subsidiary also operated branches in Greece, Turkey, Cyprus and Iran, as well as Sharm el Sheikh within the then-Israeli occupied Sinai. Before its final failure and pullout in the 1980s, Wimpy was joined in an emerging market for hamburger restaurants by Burgeranch (since 1972) and MacDavid (since 1978). Wimpy restaurants were infamous in Israel for poor product flavour, sanitation and hygiene; however, the chain did pioneer hamburger restaurants in Israel.

==== Lebanon ====
Wimpy café was established on Hamra Street in 1968 in the capital's Ras Beirut neighborhood. Hamra was part of a trendy café trottoir or sidewalk café scene that welcomed a post-1958 influx of intellectuals and political activists from Iraq, Syria, and Egypt, and proximity to the American University of Beirut. The neighborhood was an international destination through the 1960s and early 1970s until the Lebanese Civil War.

On June 6, 1982, Israel invaded Lebanon, starting the 1982 Lebanon War. On September 24, 1982, Wimpy became the scene of an attack by a Syrian Social Nationalist Party member on a group of Israeli soldiers having coffee.

In his 1991 film, Nagi El-Ali, about the life and assassination of political cartoonist Nagi al-Ali, director Atef El Tayeb filmed the 1982 Wimpy Operation scene on location at Hamra. The biographical film's subject, al-Ali, was working at the As-Safir newspaper where he and his colleagues continued to document and report on the war in spite of an Israeli press ban on August 4.

By the 2000s, the landmark café closed its doors.

==== Malaysia ====
In 1976, Wimpy opened its first outlet in Jalan Alor in Kuala Lumpur. It was most likely to have expanded to Malaysia under the Singaporean subsidiary. Their stores in Kuala Lumpur and George Town closed down in the late 1990s.

==== Saudi Arabia ====
There was a location in Jeddah, Saudi Arabia, well into the 1990s.

==== Singapore ====
Wimpy opened its first Singaporean location in 1980, in Choa Chu Kang. It also opened nine other restaurants before closing down in the late 1990s. The Singaporean subsidiary also operated branches in Indonesia and Malaysia.

==== Thailand ====
Wimpy had several locations in major Thai cities such as Bangkok, Chiang Mai and Hat Yai but these stores closed down in 2005.

=== South America ===
==== Colombia ====
In Colombia, Wimpy was established in 1976, being one of the first international fast food chains operating in the country. The first Wimpy restaurant in the country began operations with the inauguration of Unicentro, the first mall-type shopping centre in Bogotá, in April 1976.

Competition from other chains was difficult, and the assets of Wimpy Colombiana Ltd were sold to competitor Presto (Frayco) in 2008, thus ending the presence of the chain in the country.

== See also ==
- Wimpy Operation
- List of hamburger restaurants
- Starburger
