= Wimpy Operation =

1982 Syrian attack on Israeli soldiers in Beirut, Lebanon

- Part of 1982 Lebanon War and Israeli occupation of Southern Lebanon
- Location: 33°53′43.6″N 35°29′1.3″E; Hamra, Beirut, Lebanon
- Date: 24 September 1982; 44 years ago
- Attack type: Shooting
- Deaths: 1 IDF officer
- Injuries: 2 IDF soldiers
- Perpetrator: Khaled Alwan

The Wimpy Operation (Arabic: عملية الويمبي) was an attack on Israeli soldiers in Hamra, a neighbourhood in the west of the Lebanese capital Beirut on September 24, 1982 during the 1982 Lebanon War. The Wimpy Operation marked the start of a campaign against Israeli forces in Beirut.

== The attack ==
Located on Hamra Street, the Wimpy Cafe was a gathering point for the cosmopolitan intelligentsia of Beirut.

In the afternoon on September 24, 1982 Khaled Alwan, a 19-year-old member of the Syrian Social Nationalist Party (SSNP) opened fire on Israeli soldiers drinking coffee at the entrance to the Wimpy Cafe. He killed an Israeli officer with his pistol and injured two Israeli soldiers accompanying the officer (one injured in the chest, the other in the neck). After the shooting, Alwan walked home. Legend has it that Alwan had been upset with seeing the Israeli officer insisting to pay his bill at Wimpy with shekels. The Lebanese National Resistance Front claimed responsibility for the operation.

== Aftermath ==
The Wimpy Operation prompted other residents of the city to engage in resistance against the Israeli troops. Such acts continued until the withdrawal of Israeli troops from the capital.

Alwan was killed in an ambush in 1984.

== Legacy ==
Poster commemorating Khaled Alwan. Main text reads 'The hero of the Wimpy Operation – Martyred Comrade Khaled Alwan'

The SSNP commemorates the Wimpy Operation annually. In 2000, the site of the attack was renamed "Place Khaled Alwan" by the municipality of Beirut, in honour of his contributions to the resistance. In 2003 Alwan was awarded the Lebanese Order of Merit posthumously. Writing on the political dimensions of resistance memorials, Franck Mermier noted that members of the Lebanese Communist Party claimed that Alwan had been aided in the Wimpy Operation by two persons; another SSNP member and a Communist Party member named Charbel Abboud. According to Mermier, this claim does not appear in the official SSNP narratives regarding the operation.

In Memory and Conflict in Lebanon, Craig Larkin argues that the "[t]he mythical power of this act" enabled a narrative which helped subsume memories of intra-Lebanese violence in the Civil War in favour of a "more pressing narrative of Israeli aggression and violence".

== See also ==
- 1982 Lebanon War
- Israeli–Lebanese conflict
