= 13th pension =

Polish financial benefit

The thirteenth pension (Polish: trzynasta emerytura) is an additional annual financial benefit provided to retired individuals and disability pensioners as part of social welfare and aging policy, implemented in Poland by second cabinet of Mateusz Morawiecki. The benefit amount is equal to the minimum old-age pension. Jarosław Kaczyński announced 13th pension social benefit in February 2019, with the law introduced on 4 April 2019. Former Prime Minister Beata Szydło referred to this at a party convention as a "gift from Jarosław Kaczyński".

Initially, the financial benefit was intended to be a one-time payment in 2019; however, prior to the 2019 Polish parliamentary election, the Law and Justice party pledged that, if re-elected, the benefit would become a permanent annual payment starting in 2020. In 2019, the 13th pension was given to nearly 10 million people, costing around 10.8 billion PLN. In 2024 it was given to 8.5 million people, and in 2025, between April 1 and 20, nearly 7 million receivers, with 13 billion PLN allocated from the state budget.

== Amount of the 13th pension ==
| Year | Gross amount | Net amount |
|---|---|---|
| 2019 | 1,100 PLN | 888 PLN |
| 2020 | 1,200 PLN | 981 PLN |
| 2021 | 1,250.88 PLN | 1,022.30 PLN |
| 2022 | 1,338.44 PLN | 1,217.98 PLN |
| 2023 | 1,588.44 PLN | 1,445.48 PLN |
| 2024 | 1,780.96 PLN | 1,620.67 PLN |
| 2025 | 1,879.91 PLN | 1,709.82 PLN |
| 2026 | 1,978.49 PLN | 1,800.44 PLN |

Eligible recipients receive the pension regardless of how much they earn. The amount paid is the same for all beneficiaries. The benefit is subject to a 9% deduction for health insurance; if the pension exceeds 2,500 PLN per month (or annual income exceeds 30,000 PLN), there is an additional 12% deduction for income tax (deducted from gross amount).

== Opinions ==
=== Goal ===
According to the legislator, the purpose of introducing the thirteenth pension was to provide financial support to retirees and disability pensioners, as well as to reduce social and economic inequalities.

=== Positive ===
It is automatically paid together with the April pension (no application required), making it a regular and predictable form of financial support for seniors—temporary yet often strategically timed during a challenging period of the year. It helps mitigate the impact of inflation on retirees.

=== Negative ===
The pension is granted to all retirees and disability pensioners, regardless of the amount of their benefits. Critics point out that individuals with higher pensions receive the same support as those with the lowest benefits, which can be perceived as unfair.

== See also ==
- 14th pension
