= Edenred =

French payment service provider

Edenred SE
- Type: Public (Societas Europaea)
- Traded as: Euronext Paris: EDEN; CAC Next 20 component
- Industry: Corporate services
- Founded: June 29, 2010 (Note: Date of demerger from Accor.)
- Headquarters: Issy-les-Moulineaux, France
- Area served: Worldwide
- Key people: Bertrand Dumazy (Chairman and CEO)
- Products: Ticket Restaurant®
- Revenue: ▲€2.31 billion (2023)
- Operating income: ▲€706 million (2023)
- Net income: ▼€267 million (2023)
- Number of employees: 10,000 employees as of February 22, 2022
- Website: edenred.com

Edenred, formerly known as Accor Services, is an international payment service provider based in France. The company focuses on payment services used in the workplace, including employee benefits such as Ticket Restaurant meal vouchers, as well as other business-to-business payment solutions. The company was created following Accor’s split and has been listed on Euronext Paris since 2010. Edenred operates internationally, with activities in 46 countries.

== History ==
=== Foundation and Accor integration (1962–2009) ===
Jacques Borel created a meal voucher in France called Ticket Restaurant in 1962. He was inspired by the original Luncheon Voucher, a concept launched in the United Kingdom in 1954 and the Luncheon Vouchers Company founded by John Hack in 1955. A French government decree, passed in 1967, officially recognized the meal voucher as an employee benefit. The concept was launched outside France starting in 1976. Ticket Restaurant and its local variant Ticket Alimentación began spreading to other countries in Europe and Latin America, including Brazil and Mexico.

The Ticket Restaurant entity, which had been a subsidiary of Accor since 1983, became Accor Services in 1998. Accor had also acquired Luncheon Vouchers one year prior. Thus the two entities were merged under the new name of Accor Services.

In September 2007, Accor Services acquired a 98.3% stake UK pioneer and market leader in prepaid cards, PrePay Technologies Ltd, for €55M.

=== Formation of Edenred (2010–present) ===
Following the split of Accor's hotel and prepaid services businesses, Accor Services became Edenred in June 2010. The group was listed on NYSE Euronext Paris on July 2, 2010.

Edenred also launched the Ticket Plus Card in Germany (staple goods: food, fuel, meals), Ticket Cultura in Brazil (cultural goods and services), and Fides Cloud Loyalty Software in India, managed by its subsidiary Accentiv India Pvt. Ltd.

In 2014, Edenred acquired C3, a leader in the employee payroll cards market in the United Arab Emirates. The Group also acquired 34% of UTA, Europe’s second largest fuel card issuer, before increasing its stake to 51% in January 2017 to 66% in 2018 and 100% in 2020.

Bertrand Dumazy became chairman and chief executive officer of Edenred on October 26, 2015.

The group shifted focus to digital products and launched the Ticket Restaurant card in France in April 2014. As of 2021, 90% of the group's business volume around the world was generated from digital products.

In 2016, the Group began a far-reaching transformation as part of its Fast Forward strategic plan (2016-2019). In that year, Edenred also launched its Corporate Payment Services business and acquired Embratec's operations in Brazil. In November 2018, Edenred announced the acquisition of Corporate Spending Innovations, an electronic B2B payments company, for $600 million.

In May 2023, Edenred acquired Reward Gateway, a UK-based employee engagement platform, to extend its Employee Benefits solutions for an enterprise value of GBP 1.15 billion.

== Products ==
Edenred’s operations are organised around three business lines. In employee benefits, the group issues meal and food benefits under brands such as Ticket Restaurant/Ticket Alimentación and also offers gift and incentive solutions as well as employee engagement platforms, a segment it expanded by acquiring Reward Gateway in 2023. In mobility solutions, Edenred provides fleet and fuel cards and related services in Europe through UTA Edenred, following its purchase of a stake in Union Tank Eckstein (UTA) in 2014. In corporate payments, Edenred develops virtual cards, accounts‑payable automation and other B2B payment services, strengthened by its 2018 acquisition of U.S. based Corporate Spending Innovations (CSI).

Key product families include Ticket Restaurant meal benefits in markets such as France and Latin America, which can be used in restaurants and approved food retailers subject to national rules (for example, in France a daily spending ceiling and defined acceptance categories apply). In Europe, UTA Edenred issues fuel cards accepted across multi‑brand networks and has added services for road payments and, more recently, electric‑vehicle charging via its UTA eCharge offer. In the United Kingdom and other European markets, Reward Gateway provides employee engagement tools including benefits portals and recognition programmes.

== Expansion ==
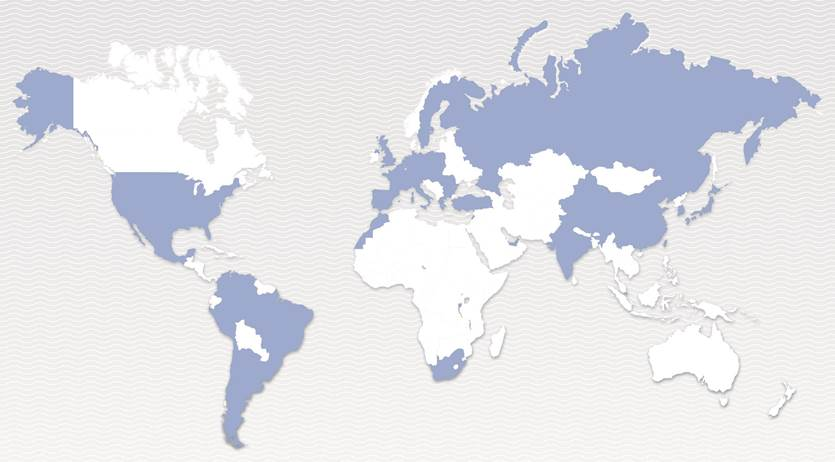
Edenred has subsidiaries in 46 countries.

Edenred operates in 46 countries and has over 10,000 employees. The group has moved into new countries since 2010: Finland in 2011, Japan in 2012, Russia, the United Arab Emirates in 2014 and Moldova in 2018.
