= 14th pension =

Annual cash benefit for old and disability pensioners in Poland

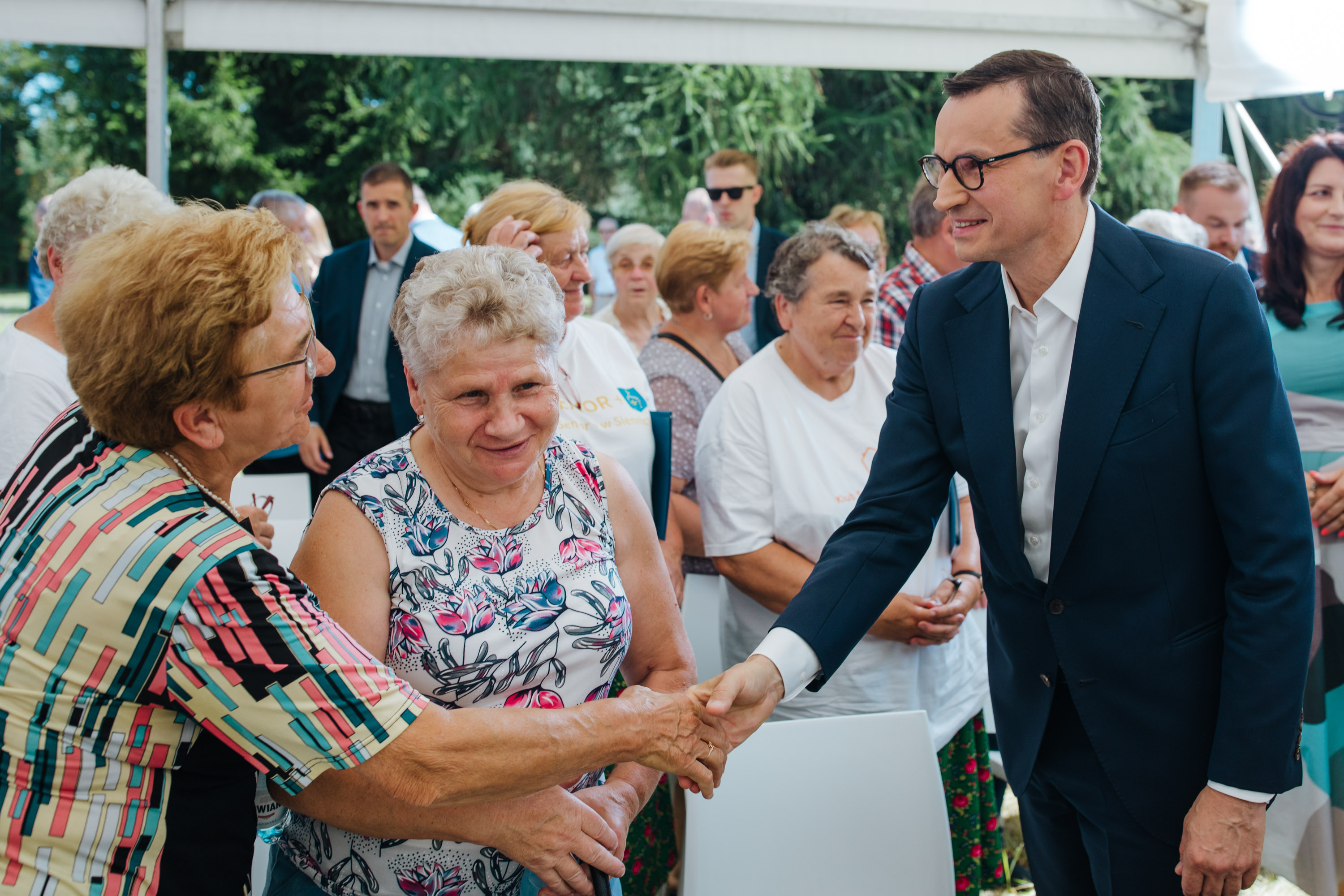
Prime Minister Mateusz Morawiecki meeting with seniors in Siennice, introducing the 14th retirement benefit to them.

Fourteenth pension (Polish: czternasta emerytura) is an additional annual benefit granted to retirees and pensioners in Poland, equal to the amount of the minimum retirement pension. It was introduced by Law and Justice (PiS) under the second cabinet of Mateusz Morawiecki in 2021, and made permanent in 2023, following the earlier introduction of the 13th pension in 2019.

== Background ==
On 21 January 2021, a law was passed granting pensioners an additional 14th pension in November 2021. Originally intended as a one-time payment, it was also decided later to be paid out in August 2022. On 27 July 2023, the 14th pension was made permanent, to be paid annually every August. No application or declaration is necessary for a payout, making it easier for receivers.

== Eligibility ==
Individuals eligible to receive the benefit include those receiving:

- Old-age pensions
- Disability benefits (pensions)
- Social pensions
- Family pensions
- Pensions for war and military invalids
- Pre-retirement benefits

== Amount of the 14th pension ==
The amount of this benefit is always equal to the gross amount of the minimum retirement pension in the country. According to the law, the Council of Ministers has until October 31 to issue an ordinance specifying the amount of the 14th pension, as well as when and how it should be distributed. In order to receive the full amount of the supplement, the retiree's monthly gross income cannot exceed 2,900 PLN. Otherwise, the pension will be reduced according to the "zloty for zloty" rule, meaning that for every zloty received from a monthly retirement pension above the 2,900 zł threshold, will result in the benefit being reduced by one zloty. If, as a result of this reduction, the amount of the benefit would be less than 50 PLN, the benefit will not be granted.

Year	Gross amount	Net amount	Source
2021	1,250.88 PLN	1,022.30 PLN	
2022	1,338.44 PLN	1,217.98 PLN	
2023	2,650 PLN (Note: Exception: The 2023 amount was predetermined instead of being based on the minimum year's pension.)	2,202.50 PLN	
2024	1,780.96 PLN	1,620.67 PLN	
2025	1,879.91 PLN	1,709.82 PLN	
2026	1,978.49 PLN	1,800.43 PLN	

The benefit is subject to taxation in amount of 9% for health insurance contribution and 12% for personal tax income (if the monthly income is above 2,500 PLN or 30,000 PLN per year).

== Statistics ==
In 2021, 9.1 million pensioners received 14th pension (7.9 million received full pension). About 7.97 million in 2022, 8.3 million – 2023, 8.9 million – 2024.

== See also ==
- 13th pension
