= Marisa Chappell =

American historian & Associate Professor

- Education: Northwestern University (PhD), Emory University (BA)
- Known for: research on economic history of the United States
- Scientific career
- Workplaces: Oregon State University
- Website: liberalarts.oregonstate.edu/users/marisa-chappell

Marisa Chappell is an American historian and associate professor at Oregon State University. She is known for her works on economic history of the United States. Her book The War on Welfare was selected by Choice Magazine as an Outstanding Academic Title for 2010.

== Books ==
- The War on Welfare: Family, Poverty, and Politics in Modern America, University of Pennsylvania Press, 2009
- Welfare in the United States: A History with Documents, Routledge Press, 2009 (co-editor with Premilla Nadasen and Jennifer Mittelstadt)
