= Jennifer Mittelstadt =

Academic and Professor of History

Jennifer Mittelstadt is Professor of History at Rutgers University. In 2022, she was awarded a Guggenheim fellowship in U.S. History. She has a Ph.D. from the University of Michigan.

== Career ==
Mittelstadt is professor of history at Rutgers University–New Brunswick. In 2017–2018, she served as the Harold K. Johnson Chair in Military History at United States Army War College.

== Selected works ==
- The Military and the Market: New Histories of War, Capitalism, and Empire, edited with Mark R. Wilson (Philadelphia: Penn Press, 2022)
- The Rise of the Military Welfare State (Harvard University Press, 2015)
- Welfare in the United States: A History with Documents, co-authored and edited with Premilla Nadasen and Marisa Chappell (New York: Routledge, 2009)
- From Welfare to Workfare: The Unintended Consequences of Liberal Reform, 1945-1964 (University of North Carolina Press, 2005)

== Awards ==
- Guggenheim Fellowship Award (2022–23)
- Fellow, Dorothy and Lewis Cullman Center for Scholars and Writers, New York Public Library, 2020-2021
- Woodrow Wilson International Center for Scholars, 2008-2009
