= Jacques Borel (businessman) =

French restaurateur

Jacques Borel (born 9 April 1927) is a French businessman. In 1961, he brought fast food to France with a franchise of Wimpy, and opened restaurants in Paris and other cities before the company's head office shut them down at the end of the decade. He pioneered Ticket Restaurant (now Edenred) in 1962. In 1969, he opened France's first roadside restaurant. He set up a consultancy in 1994 to lobby for value-added tax reductions for restaurants.

== Early life ==
Borel was born on 9 April 1927 in Paris. As a teenager, he was part of the French Resistance. At 13, he worked as a courier sending messages between fighters in occupied and Vichy France, and he met his future wife at the liberation of Paris in 1944, when he was 17. A graduate of HEC Paris in 1950, he completed his apprenticeship in management positions at IBM, where his father, William Borel, headed the French branch. Jacques Borel led IBM in Vietnam during the French colonial period.

== Business career ==
In 1957, Borel opened the self-service restaurant Auberge Express. He attached pedometers to his waiters to ensure they were not walking too much. On 31 May 1961, he opened France's first hamburger restaurant, a franchise of the American company Wimpy. The venue was the Rue du 4 Septembre in the 2nd arrondissement of Paris. Borel saw hamburgers served to table as a winning option, as the only other competitor was cold pork sandwiches served at bars. In addition, ground beef was growing as an option, as increased female employment limited the amount of time that remained for women to cook beef at home.

Borel recorded losses in his first two years of fast food, but by 1966 he was serving 60,000 meals per day, and recording an annual income of over $15 million. In the same year, he expanded out of the capital with a restaurant in Lille. His portfolio expanded to 15 restaurants in Paris and five in the rest of the country, but they disappeared before the end of the decade due to disputes with head office in the UK; McDonald's then came to France in 1972.

In 1962, Borel pioneered Ticket Restaurant (now Edenred), vouchers sold to large employers to feed employers instead of using their own cafeterias. He had discovered the practice in the UK. By 1967, the practice was recognised by the state and no taxes were required on it. In 1968, he sold 65% of his company to American conglomerate W. R. Grace in order to finance future growth; this share reduced to 15.2% by 1977.

Borel targeted the growth of motorways in France in the late 1960s. Only 2% of French drivers stopped at restaurants in 1966, compared to 60% in the United States; the French preferred to pull over and have a picnic. He set up France's first motorway restaurant in 1969. His record for sales in one day was to 14,238 people at an outlet on the A6 in the summer. He said "the most difficult thing was not feeding all those holiday makers, but keeping the toilets clean". By 1977, his company owned 850 restaurants, 37 hotels, 700 canteens inside large organisations, and had an annual revenue of $400 million.

In 1975, Borel's investment company Jacques Borel International bought the 4-star hotel chain Sofitel from the Banque de Paris et des Pays-Bas. The deal led to the suicide of Sofitel chairman Marcel Aubert, a $10 million loss for Borel's company, and his statement that the bank had "proposed a marriage, but when I had married the girl I found she had a lover, suffered from tuberculosis and had already pawned her dowry", for which he apologised. He was ousted by the board in 1977. French newspaper Le Monde wrote "More American than the Americans he fell in the American style".

After failed experiments in fast food in the United States, Mexico and Brazil, he returned to France and opened Jacques Borel Consultants in 1994, who successfully lobbied for a reduced value-added tax of 5.5% in French restaurants. He achieved VAT cuts in other European countries in the 21st century.

== Recognition ==
Borel was known as the "Napoléon du prêt-à-manger" (Napoleon of ready-to-eat foods). For his role in fast food, newspaper France-Soir called him "public enemy number one". He was the inspiration for the character Jacques Tricatel in the 1976 French film The Wing or the Thigh (L'Aile ou la Cuisse), based on the confrontation between traditional French cuisine and fast food at the time.

In 2008, Borel was made a knight of the Legion of Honour.
