= Starburger =

British restaurant chain

- Industry: Restaurant symbol group
- Founded: March 1983
- Founder: Altan Gultekin and Altan Munir
- Owner: Ercan Ucur
- Parent: TFC Holdings

Starburger is a British symbol group of restaurants, predominantly selling hamburgers and full English breakfasts, founded in March 1983.

== History ==
Founded in March 1983, Starburger acts predominantly as a wholesale provider to the restaurant industry.

In June 2019, TFC Holdings purchased Starburger for an undisclosed sum.

In November 2020, its Sudbury, Suffolk location celebrated 40 years of trade.
