= Meal voucher =

Form of payment for food

A meal voucher or luncheon voucher is a voucher for food. A meal voucher may be redeemable for a meal given to employees as an employee benefit, allowing them to eat at outside restaurants, typically for lunch. In many countries, meal vouchers have had favorable tax treatment. Vouchers are typically in the form of paper tickets but are gradually being replaced by electronic vouchers in the form of a special payment card.

== United Kingdom ==
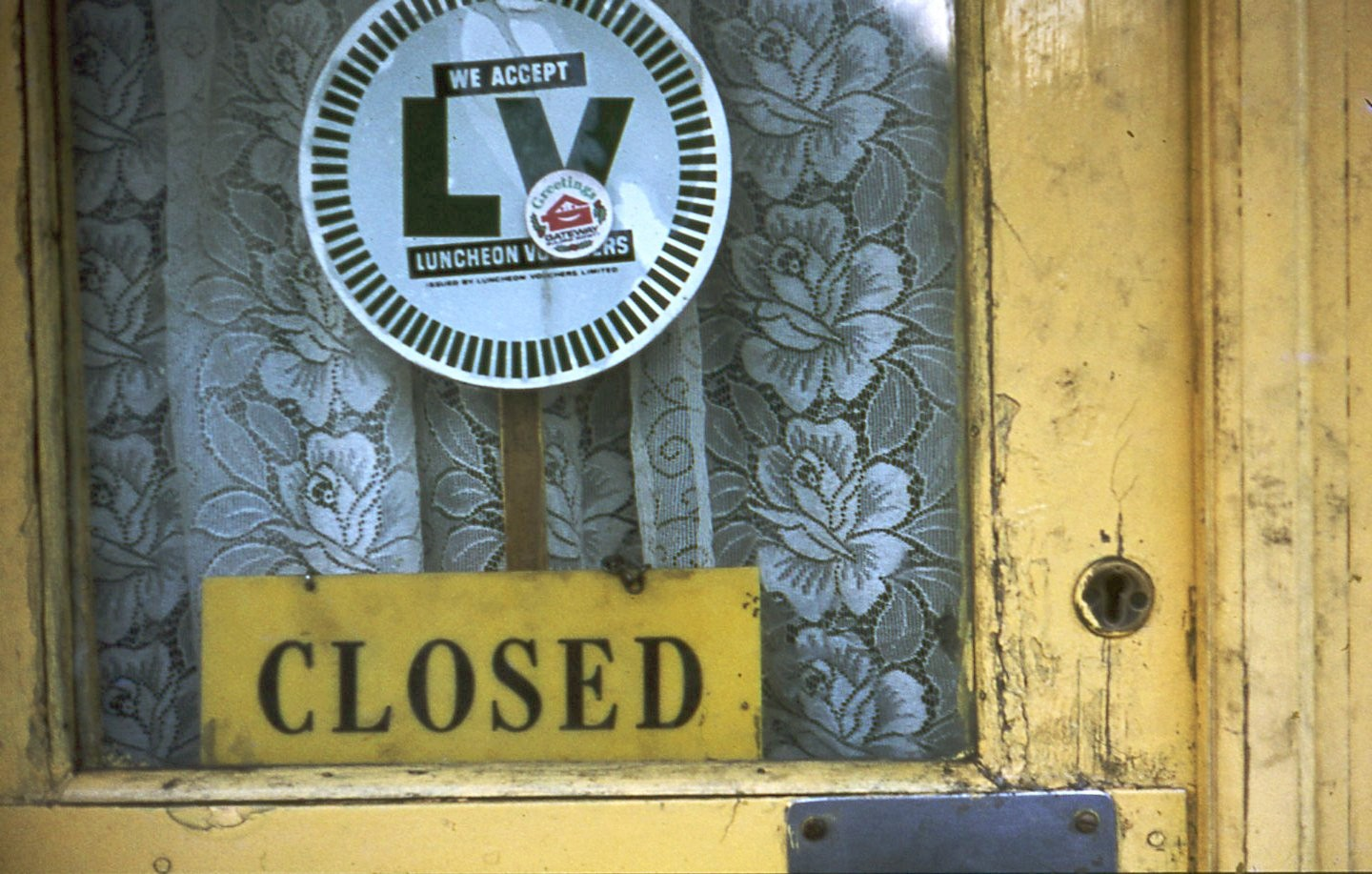
A sticker showing acceptance of luncheon vouchers at Mac's Caff, Station Road, Wood Green in North London in August 1982

A luncheon voucher was a paper ticket (voucher) used by some employees in the United Kingdom to pay for meals in private restaurants. It allowed companies to subsidise midday meals (luncheons) for their employees without having to run their own canteens.

The scheme dates to 1946, when food rationing was still in force following the end of the war. The British government granted an extra-statutory tax concession, believing that this would help citizens afford healthy meals. Under the concession, meal vouchers were free of income tax and national insurance contributions up to the value of 3 shillings (15 pence) a day. The initial level of 2s. 3d. (11.25p, £5.01 in 2021) was increased in 1948 to level of 3/- (15p, £5.80 in 2021), but was not later adjusted for inflation. The concession was abolished as redundant, 15p per day having become a trivial amount, from 6 April 2013.

In the early days, a company that wanted to subsidise its staff lunches, but not to run a canteen, had to have vouchers printed and make arrangements with one or more local restaurants to accept them. In addition, it would have to administer the scheme (for instance by checking and counting the vouchers returned from the restaurants prior to settling their account). In 1954, a businessman, John Hack, realised that a single standardised voucher acceptable across the UK would be more logical and efficient. He subsequently started Luncheon Vouchers Limited in November 1954 to implement a nationwide luncheon voucher scheme. In 1956, nine large catering companies purchased the company, with Hack staying on as managing director. The company was bought by Accor in 1982. Restaurants that accepted the vouchers displayed an "LV" logo in their windows.

In 1978, luncheon vouchers became associated with London brothel madam Cynthia Payne after a police raid, when confused media reports said her brothel accepted the vouchers as payment. In fact, she used out-of-date vouchers as difficult-to-forge physical accounting tokens for "proof of services performed".

== Accor and Edenred ==
By 1983, Accor owned both the British Luncheon Vouchers and the French Ticket Restaurant. Accor spun off the voucher business in 1998 as Accor Services, which became Edenred in 2010.

== Belgium ==
Meal vouchers were introduced in Belgium in 1965. Electronic meal vouchers were introduced in 2011 and the old paper meal voucher system was phased out on 1 January 2016.

== Bulgaria ==
In Bulgaria, meal vouchers (ваучери за храна, vaucheri za hrana) operate under two distinct legal mechanisms depending on their purpose:

- Ordinance No. 7 (issued jointly by the Ministry of Finance and the Ministry of Labor and Social Policy) covers voluntary social benefits provided by employers. Under Article 209 of the Bulgarian Corporate Income Tax Act, employers can distribute non-taxable meal vouchers up to a monthly limit of 200 BGN (approx. €102.26) per employee. These are exempt from corporate income tax and social security contributions provided they are offered to all employees equally, the company has no outstanding public debts, and employee base salaries have not been reduced in the preceding three months. Rulings allow the total amount to be calculated proportionally based on actual hours worked, provided the practice is documented internally and applied uniformly.
- Ordinance No. 11 governs mandatory free food and drink provided by employers to staff working under specific labor conditions, night shifts, or high-risk environment hazards. Unlike Ordinance No. 7, these vouchers are mandated by occupational safety laws, require a workplace health and safety risk assessment, and are not capped by standard state quotas.

Following legislative amendments published in the State Gazette, Bulgaria fully digitized its Ordinance No. 7 system, transitioning entirely to electronic cards and virtual instruments operated by licensed private providers. Legacy paper vouchers under Ordinance No. 7 were completely phased out on 1 July 2024, whereas Ordinance No. 11 vouchers remain strictly on paper due to distinct regulatory constraints. Under the digital system, funds allocated to an employee's electronic balance remain valid for up to 12 months from the date of issuance. Vouchers can only be redeemed for food and non-alcoholic beverages at retail outlets contracted with the licensed operator; they cannot be used to purchase alcohol or tobacco, or to make cash withdrawals at ATMs.

== France ==
Meal vouchers were introduced to France in 1962 by Jacques Borel, who was inspired by Luncheon Vouchers; he called them Ticket Restaurant. Starting in 1976, Ticket Restaurant expanded outside France, and became part of Accor in 1983.

== Portugal ==
In Portugal, the meal allowance is an optional supplementary remuneration package through which employers contribute to their employees' living expenses arising from their professional activities. It can be granted in two ways: in kind, mainly through a dedicated electronic card (commonly known as a “meal card”), or in cash, added to the basic salary.

== United States ==
The Supplemental Nutrition Assistance Program, formerly and colloquially still known as the Food Stamp Program, or simply food stamps, is a United States federal government program that provides food-purchasing assistance for low- and no-income persons to help them maintain adequate nutrition and health. It is a federal aid program administered by the U.S. Department of Agriculture (USDA) under the Food and Nutrition Service (FNS), though benefits are distributed by specific departments of U.S. states (e.g., the Division of Social Services, the Department of Health and Human Services, etc.). In 2018, SNAP benefits supplied roughly 40 million Americans, at an expenditure of $57.1 billion.

Breadcoin was created in Washington DC in 2016 to address food insecurity.
