= Voucher =

Bond which can be redeemed for specific goods

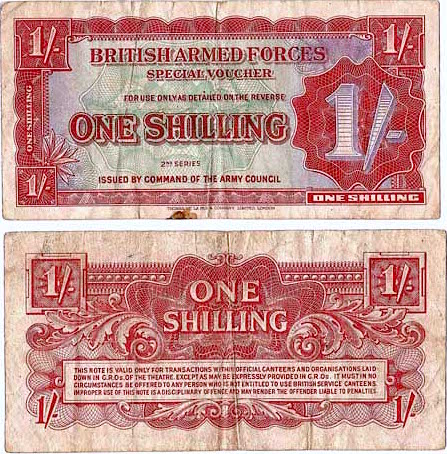
This British Army Forces Voucher, issued to soldiers in Germany following World War II, may be used only in canteens or other specified transactions.

A voucher is a bond which is worth a certain monetary value and which may be redeemed only for specific reasons or on specific goods. Examples include housing, travel, and meal vouchers. Vouchers are a form of scrip. The term voucher is also a synonym for receipt and is often used to refer to receipts used as evidence of, for example, the declaration that a service has been performed or that an expenditure has been made.

The term is also commonly used for labour vouchers and school vouchers, which are somewhat different.

== In tourism ==
Vouchers are used in the tourism sector primarily as proof of a named customer's right to take a service at a specific time and place. Service providers collect them to return to the tour operator or travel agent that has sent that customer, to prove they have given the service. So, the life of a voucher is as below:

1. Customer receives vouchers from tour operator or travel agent for the services purchased
2. Customer goes to vacation site and forwards the voucher to related provider and asks for the service to be provided
3. Provider sends collected vouchers to the agent or operator that sends customers from time to time, and asks for payment for those services
4. Uncollected vouchers do not deserve payment

This approach is most suitable for free individual tourist activities where pre-allocation for services are not necessary, feasible or applicable. It was customary before the information era when communication was limited and expensive, but now has been given quite a different role by B2C applications. When a reservation is made through the internet, customers are often provided a voucher through email or a website that can be printed. Providers customarily require this voucher be presented prior to providing the service.

== Account voucher ==
An account voucher is an accounting document representing an internal intent to make a payment to an external entity, such as a vendor or service provider. A voucher is produced usually after receiving a vendor invoice, after the invoice is successfully matched to a purchase order. A voucher will contain detailed information regarding the payee, the monetary amount of the payment, a description of the transaction, and more. In accounts payable systems, a process called a "payment run" is executed to generate payments corresponding to the unpaid vouchers. These payments can then be released or held at the discretion of an accounts payable supervisor or the company controller.

The term can also be used with reference to accounts receivable, where it is also a document representing intent to make an adjustment to an account, and for the general ledger where there is need to adjust the accounts within that ledger; in that case it is referred to as a journal voucher.

Any documentary evidence supporting the entries recorded in the books of accounts, establishing the arithmetic accuracy of the transaction, may also be referred to as a voucher—for example, a bill, invoice, receipt, salary and wages sheet, memorandum of association, counterfoil of paying-in slip, counterfoil of cheque book, or trust deed.

== Mobile phones ==
A mobile phone voucher is a recharge number sold to a customer to recharge their SIM card with money and to extend the card's availability period. Vouchers are typically sold at retail outlets, such as phone stores run by the mobile operator or by distributors, grocery stores, and gas stations.

Vouchers are the prevalent form of recharge for prepaid mobile phones in many countries such as Italy and Spain where well over 90% of consumers use vouchers, and the UK where over 60% buy vouchers at retail. In other countries such as the United States, Ireland, and many Nordic countries, there is a growing trend of customers using Card Not Present recharge options such as online payments, or by using their mobile handsets to call the operator and recharge with a representative (CSR) or through their IVR (Interactive Voice Response) system.

A growing number of prepaid mobile operators such as Meteor in Ireland and T-Mobile USA are offering the option to send an SMS (text to pay), or use handset applications such as WAP or BREW technology.

== Internet ==
Vouchers can also be used online in the form of an e-voucher. These types of vouchers can be entered when shopping online and the relevant vouchers value added to your order. It can take the form of any code. Many companies have opted to use voucher codes for the last few years but with a massive incline in use towards late 2008 and early 2009. There are many Internet websites devoted to promoting these deals and vouchers online, as well as Facebook groups offering items such as student discounts and 2-for-1 restaurant voucher deals. Many companies have started their business around coupons as affiliate marketing.

There are a small number of sites that use a disreputable method of click to reveal method for dropping cookies on the consumer's computer, which has led to the introduction of guidelines for voucher use in Internet marketing.

Most video game special editions come with a voucher for exclusive content in-game. Also, pre-ordering games at certain shops may entitle the purchaser to vouchers to content only available if you pre-order at that store.

== See also ==
- Canadian Tire Money
- Coupon
- Supplemental Nutrition Assistance Program
- Gift card
- Loyalty program
- ROC consumer voucher
- Token coin
- Token money
