= Alicia Garza =

American activist and writer (born 1981)

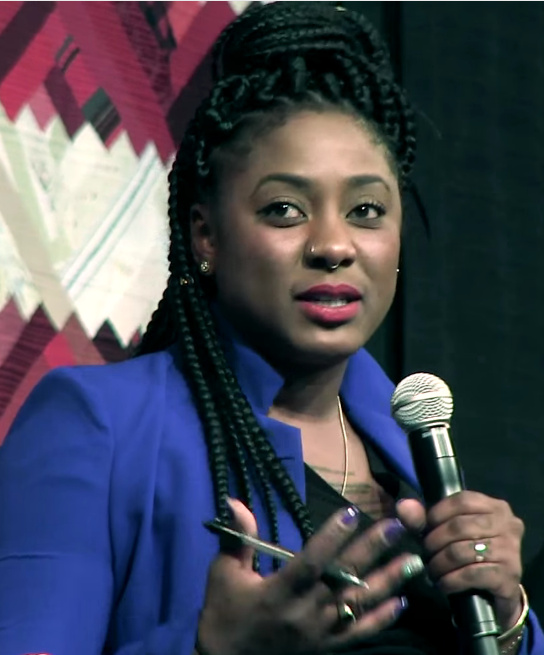
- Garza in 2016
- Born: January 4, 1981 (age 45); Oakland, California, U.S.
- Other name: Alicia Schwartz
- Education: University of California, San Diego (BA)
- Occupation: Activist
- Known for: Black Lives Matter, People Organized to Win Employment Rights, National Domestic Workers Alliance
- Movement: Black Lives Matter, Movement for Black Lives
- Spouse: Malachi Garza (m. 2008; div. 2021)

Alicia Garza (née Schwartz; born January 4, 1981) is an American civil rights activist and writer known for co-founding the Black Lives Matter movement. She is a recognized advocate for social and racial justice, with a particular focus on issues affecting marginalized communities, including Black women, LGBTQ+ people, and immigrants. Garza is also a writer and public speaker. She has written extensively on issues related to race, gender, and social justice, and her work has appeared in numerous publications. Her editorial writing has been published by Time, Mic, Marie Claire, Elle, Essence, The Guardian, The Nation, The Feminist Wire, Rolling Stone, HuffPost, and Truthout.

Garza has worked with organizations such as the National Domestic Workers Alliance and the Black Futures Lab, which focuses on building political power for Black communities. She has also engaged in community organizing efforts and initiatives aimed at creating systemic change and challenging inequality.

Garza has served as a board member of Forward Together's Oakland branch, Black Organizing for Leadership and Dignity, and Oakland's School of Unity and Liberation/SOUL.

== Early life and education ==
Garza was born to a single mother in Oakland, California. Her family lived first in San Rafael and then Tiburon, and ran an antiques business, assisted later by her brother Joey, eight years her junior.

When she was 12 years old, Alicia engaged in activism, promoting school sex education about birth control. Enrolling in the University of California, San Diego (UCSD), she continued her activism by working at the student health center and joining the student association calling for higher pay for the university's janitors.

In her final year at college, she helped organize the first Women of Color Conference, a university-wide convocation held at UCSD in 2002. She graduated in 2002 with a degree in anthropology and sociology.

== Career ==
=== School of Unity and Liberation (SOUL) ===
In 2003 Garza returned to the Bay Area, where she began a training program in political education with the School of Unity and Liberation (SOUL) that taught young people of color how to organize, by placing them with local community based organizations in West Oakland. Garza began working with Just Cause Oakland.

=== People United for a Better Life in Oakland (PUEBLO) ===
Completing her internship at SOUL, Garza joined a campaign that researched the relationship between increasing economic security for People Of Color, and increased community security. Her initial project with PUEBLO was to gather community resistance in East Oakland against a proposed Walmart. Despite the effort, the first Walmart in that area opened in 2005.

=== People Organized to Win Employment Rights (POWER) ===
Garza worked with the grassroots organization POWER in Bayview–Hunters Point, where she advocated for economic, environmental, racial, and gender justice by promoting public housing and transit accessibility, and fought against a controversial development project, although the initiative she supported was ultimately defeated.

=== National Domestic Workers Alliance ===
Following a brief sabbatical, Garza joined the National Domestic Workers Alliance, creating a program focused on Black domestic workers. Shortly before that, she founded Black Lives Matter with Patrisse Cullors and Opal Tometi.

=== Black Lives Matter ===
stop saying we are not surprised. that's a damn shame in itself. I continue to be surprised at how little Black lives matter. And I will continue that. stop giving up on black life. Black people. I love you. I love us. Our lives matter.

— Alicia Garza's Facebook post on July 13, 2013, responsible for sparking the Black Lives Matter movement

With Opal Tometi and Patrisse Cullors, Garza birthed the Black Lives Matter hashtag. She is credited with inspiring the slogan when, after the July 2013 acquittal of George Zimmerman of murder in the death of Trayvon Martin, she posted on Facebook: "I continue to be surprised at how little Black lives matter... Our lives matter." Cullors shared this with the hashtag #BlackLivesMatter. She was also struck by the similarities of Trayvon Martin to her younger brother, Joey, feeling that Joey could have been killed instead.

The organization Black Lives Matter was spurred on by the killings of Black people by police, racial disparities within the U.S. criminal legal system, mass incarceration, police militarization, and over-criminalization. In particular, the movement was born and Garza's post became popularized after protests emerged in Ferguson, Missouri, following the death of Michael Brown.

Garza led the 2015 Freedom Ride to Ferguson, organized by Cullors and Darnell Moore, that launched the building of BlackLivesMatter chapters across the United States and the world. Garza does not think of the Black Lives Matter Movement as her creation; she feels her work is only a continuation of the resistance led by Black people in America. The movement and Garza are credited for popularizing the use of social media for mass mobilization in the United States, a practice called "mediated mobilization". This practice has been used by other movements, such as the #MeToo movement.

=== Lady Don't Take No ===
On April 10, 2020, Garza debuted her podcast, "Lady Don’t Take No", named after the song "Lady Don't Tek No" by Latyrx. It is a tribute to the Bay Area, where she discusses "political commentary with a side of beauty recommendations".

=== Book ===
Garza's first book, The Purpose of Power: How We Come Together When We Fall Apart, was published in October 2020 by Penguin Random House. Described as "an essential guide", the book tells Garza's story as an activist and shares lessons for future activists.

We can’t be afraid to establish a base that is larger than the people we feel comfortable with. Movements and bases cannot be cliques of people who already know each other. We have to reach beyond the choir and take seriously the task of organizing the unorganized—the people who don’t already speak the same language, the people who don’t eat, sleep and breathe social justice, the people who have everything at stake and are looking to be less isolated and more connected and who want to win changes in their lives and the lives of the people they love.

— Excerpt from Alicia Garza's book "The Purpose of Power"

"My experience with BLM toughened my skin and softened my heart...it taught me how to recommit to work that broke my heart every day", Garza wrote in the book. When asked about this quote in an interview with Angelica Ross, Garza responded, "I wanted people to see under the hood and under the curtains of what goes on in this work.. I’ve had the experience of feeling like I was not cut out for this work, and I wanted to humanize the movement".

=== Notability ===
Garza was one of the protesters holding back the BART train in Oakland, California, in 2014. Once this protest ended, she started a new generation of civil rights leaders. Garza is now the 27th most influential African American (behind her collaborator, Patrisse Cullors) on the Root 100, an annual list of black influencers. She has given speeches to audiences across the country, from union halls to the United Nations Office of the High Commission on Human Rights.

== Additional work ==
Garza's editorial writing has been published by The Guardian, The Nation, The Feminist Wire, Rolling Stone, HuffPost, and Truthout. She currently directs Special Projects at the National Domestic Workers Alliance.

Previously, Garza had served as the director of People Organized to Win Employment Rights (POWER) in the San Francisco Bay Area. During her time in the position, she won the right for youth to use public transportation for free in San Francisco, and campaigned against gentrification and police brutality in the area. Garza is an active participant in several Bay Area social movement groups. She is on the board of directors of Forward Together's Oakland California branch and is also involved with Black Organizing for Leadership and Dignity. She is also on the board of directors for Oakland's School of Unity and Liberation (SOUL). In 2011, she was the chairperson of Right to the City Alliance

In 2015, Garza was selected as the Member's Choice for Community Grand Marshal at 2015 Pride celebration, as she was considered a local hero in Oakland for her contributions to the LGBTQ community and society at large. Over two dozen Black Lives Matter organizers and supporters marched in the Pride Parade behind Garza, who sat next to transgender rights activist Miss Major, the previous year's Community Grand Marshal.

=== Speeches ===
Garza presented at the 2016 Bay Area Rising event, speaking about the propagation of Black Lives Matter and human rights.

In her 2017 speech to graduating students from San Francisco State University, Garza praised the indomitable spirit of Black women who laid the foundation for activism. She emphasized their crucial role in historical events, from the Underground Railroad to contemporary protest songs. Garza recognized the significant impact of Black women voters and celebrated their magic, resilience, and diverse contributions.

In 2021, Garza was the keynote speaker at UC San Diego's 2021 Commencement ceremonies.

=== Acts of protest ===
Garza participated in an attempt to stop a Bay Area Rapid Transit train for four and a half hours, a time chosen to reflect the time that Michael Brown's body was left in the street after he was killed. The protesters stopped the train for an hour and a half by chaining themselves both to the inside of the train and the outside, making it impossible for the door to close. The event ended when police removed the protestors by dismantling part of the train.

== Activism in politics ==
=== Organization Supermajority ===
Supermajority was established in the spring of 2019 and is focused on creating political power for American women. The organization Supermajority was created by Garza, Cecile Richards, and Ai-jen Poo. Supermajority intends to "train and mobilize two million women across America to become organizers, activists, and leaders ahead of the 2020 election" to create a "multiracial, intergenerational movement for women's equality." One of the main goals of Supermajority is to create "a women's new deal", with women's issues like "voting rights, gun control, paid family leave, and equal pay" seen as "issues that impact everyone" for the 2020 presidency, as well as build a greater platform for women in politics. In the 2020 election, cofounder Cecile Richards says "[the group will be successful] if 54% of voters in this country are women and if we are able to insert into this country the issues that women care about and elect a president who’s committed to doing something about them."

=== Black political power ===
In 2018 Garza launched Black Futures Lab, whose goal is to engage with advocate organizations to advance policies that make black communities stronger. Black Futures Lab's first project was the Black Census Project, the largest survey on Black people since the Reconstruction era of the United States. The survey included questions on subjects such as political attitudes, organization affiliation, experiences with racism and police violence, perceptions of social movements, access to healthcare, and economic well-being. Black Future Labs plans to use the results of the Black Census Project to determine pressing legislative and policy issues. Garza divided the Black Census Project into creating separate studies focusing on the black LGBTQ community as well as the black community's political engagement in the United States.

=== 2016 presidential election ===
While Garza has been critical of Donald Trump, she has also been critical of Barack Obama for adopting "right-wing talking points" about "racial disparities in our criminal justice system", as well as Bill Clinton, and Hillary Clinton, saying: "The Clintons use black people for votes, but then don't do anything for black communities after they're elected. They use us for photo ops." She voted for Bernie Sanders in California's Democratic primary, but promised to do everything in her power "to make sure that we are not led by Donald Trump", and voted for Clinton in the general election.

=== 2020 presidential election ===
Garza gave a speech to a crowd of 200 students on the 2020 elections in celebration of Black History Month. She spoke about how the Black Lives Matter Movement is misinterpreted as anti-white, anti-law enforcement, or a terrorist organization. In this speech, she showed support for the Green New Deal, condemned voter suppression, and called for more voter involvement. Garza endorsed Elizabeth Warren in the Democratic primary.

== Recognition and awards ==
Garza was recognized on the Root 100 list of African American Achievers between the ages of 25 and 45. She was also recognized on the Politico50 2015 guide to Thinkers, Doers, and Visionaries, along with Cullors and Tometi.

Garza has received the Local Hero award from the San Francisco Bay Guardian. She has been twice awarded by the Harvey Milk Democratic Club the Bayard Rustin Community Activist Award for her work fighting racism and gentrification in San Francisco. She has also been awarded the Jeanne Gauna Communicate Justice Award from the Centre for Media Justice.

In 2015, Garza, Cullors, and Tometi (as "The Women of #BlackLivesMatter") were among the nine runners-up for The Advocate's Person of the Year.

In 2017, Garza, Patrisse Cullors and Opal Tometi were awarded the Sydney Peace Prize.

In 2018, Garza was named in the inaugural cohort of the Atlantic Fellows for Racial Equity (AFRE). This first cohort of 29 Atlantic Fellows are focused on challenging racism in the U.S. and South Africa and disrupting the rise of white nationalism and supremacy.

In 2019, Time created 89 new covers to celebrate women of the year starting from 1920; it chose her, Cullors, and Tometi for 2013.

In 2020, Garza was named to Fortune magazine's '40 Under 40' list under the "Government and Politics" category.

In 2020, Garza was included in Time magazine's 100 Most Influential People of 2020 and on the list of the BBC's 100 Women announced on 23 November 2020.

In 2020, Garza also was number 32 on Fast Company's Queer 50 list. In 2022, she was number 40 on the list.

== Personal life ==
In 2004, Garza came out as queer to her family. She was married to Malachi Garza, also a community activist, for 13 years. They met in 2004, married in 2008 and lived in Oakland until they announced the end of their relationship in 2021.

Garza's chest tattoo, inspired by June Jordan's "Poem about My Rights," reads "I am not wrong: Wrong is not my name. My name is my own my own my own," reflecting the profound connection between #Black Lives Matter and the deep roots of African American culture.

In 2018, Garza's mother died from glioblastoma.
