= United State of Women Summit =

Summit in the United States

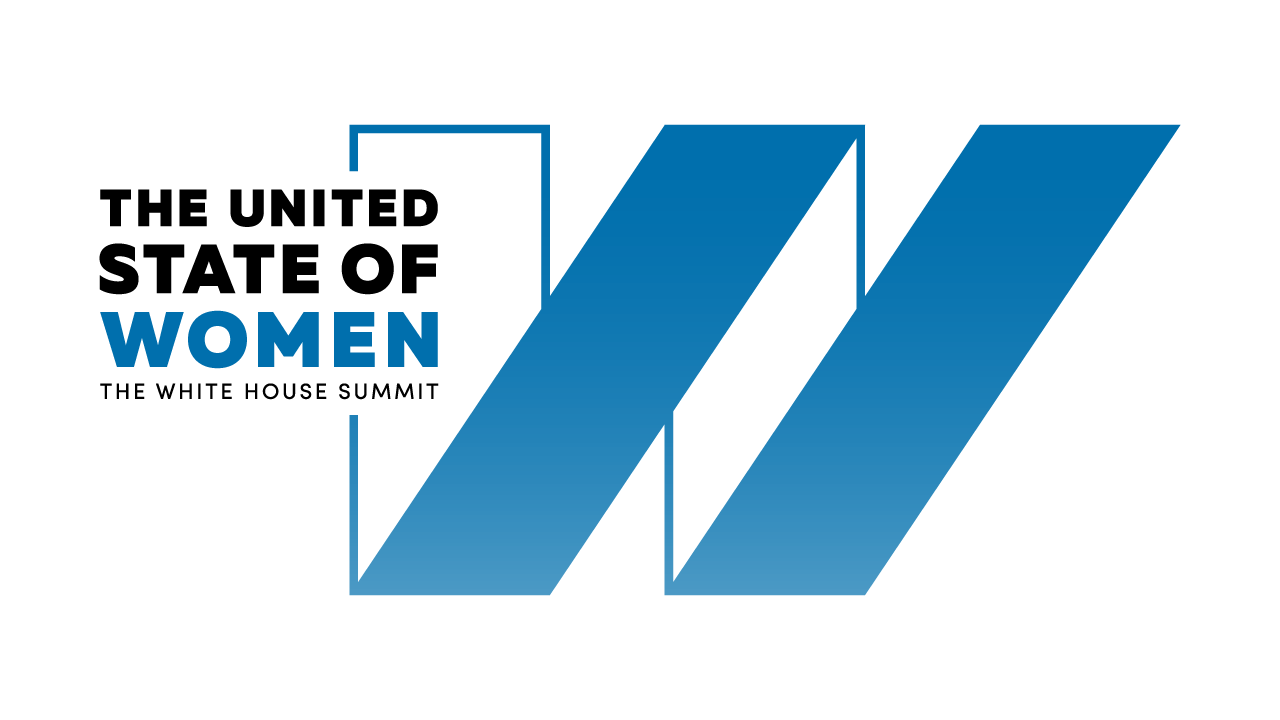
- Host country: United States
- Date: June 14, 2016
- Venue(s): Walter E. Washington Convention Center
- Cities: Washington, D.C.
- Website: www.theunitedstateofwomen.org

The United State of Women Summit was a summit held in Washington, D.C. on June 14, 2016 focused on gender equality in the United States. The summit was hosted by the White House, the U.S. Department of State, the U.S. Department of Labor, and the Aspen Institute.

== Background ==
The White House first announced the summit on January 29, 2016, with the theme "Today we change tomorrow." Originally scheduled for May 23, the summit was postponed to June 14.

On June 7, First Lady Michelle Obama announced the summit on a video, alongside Meryl Streep, Oprah Winfrey, Tina Fey, Laverne Cox, Kerry Washington, Shonda Rhimes, Cecile Richards, and Jessica Williams.

== Agenda ==
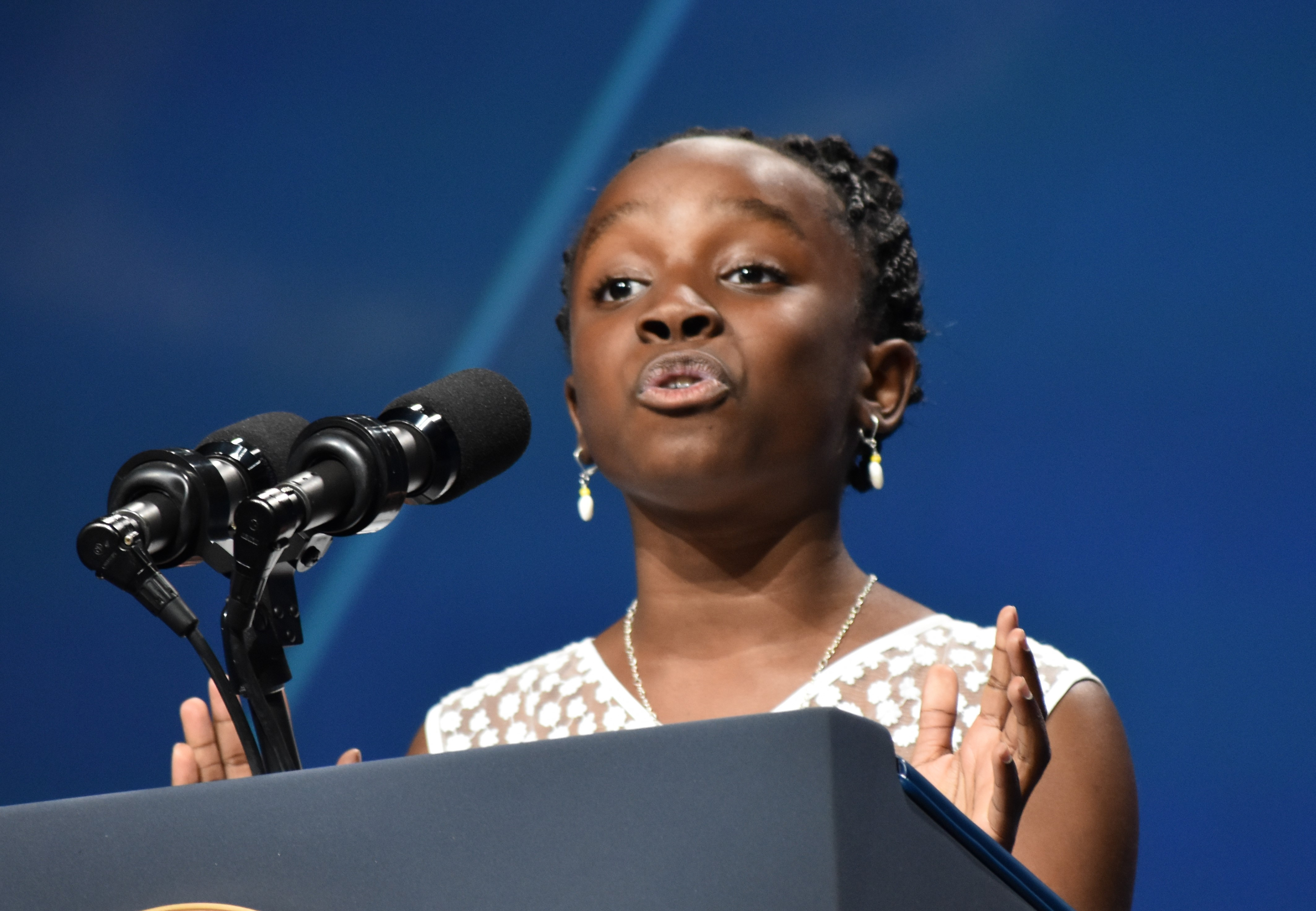
Mikaila Ulmer speaking at the summit in 2016.

The summit was dedicated to discussing a number of topics, including economic empowerment, equal pay for equal work, women's health, women's education, violence against women, entrepreneurship, and civic engagement. Ciiru Waithaka, a Kenya entrepreneur, was lauded by Michelle Obama. She recognised their common ancestry and said "You Go Girl". Obama noted that Waithaka had doubled her production of school furniture thanks to a loan of 10,000 by Goldman Sachs. Obama recognised her as a woman who was helping other women and families to follow her lead.

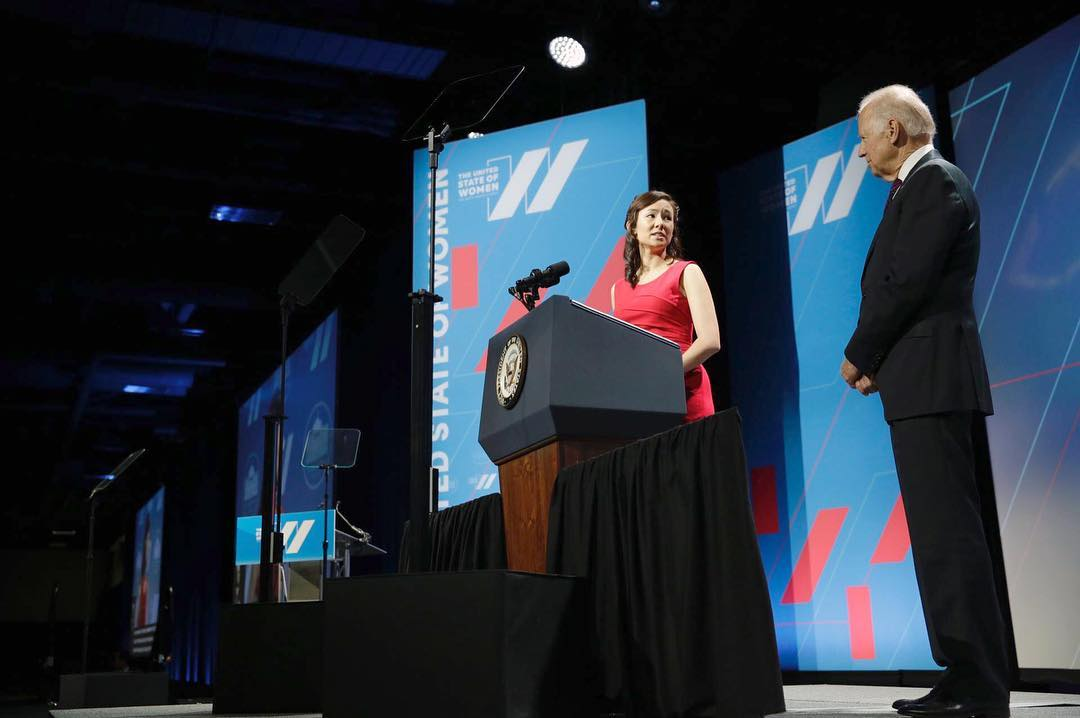
Joe Biden at the United State of Women Summit.

President Barack Obama, one of the key speakers at the summit, was introduced by child entrepreneur Mikaila Ulmer. He discussed feminism, violence committed against women by groups such as ISIL and Boko Haram, and the progress made by his administration in supporting family leave and the minimum wage. Vice President Joe Biden was another key speaker, citing campus sexual assault as a major issue.

== Participants ==
- Barack Obama, President of the United States
- Michelle Obama, First Lady of the United States
- Joe Biden, Vice President of the United States
- Valerie Jarrett, Senior Advisor to the President
- Loretta Lynch, U.S. Attorney General
- Thomas Perez, U.S. Secretary of Labor
- Heather Higginbottom, Deputy Secretary of State for Management and Resources
- Walter Isaacson, President of the Aspen Institute
- Nancy Pelosi, House Democratic Leader
- Cecile Richards, President of Planned Parenthood
- Connie Britton
- Kerry Washington
- Oprah Winfrey
- Warren Buffett
- Camila María Concepción
- Fay Cobb Payton

== See also ==
- White House Council on Women and Girls
- White House Task Force to Protect Students from Sexual Assault
- ARC3 Survey
- United States Women's Bureau
