= Richard Moore (activist) =

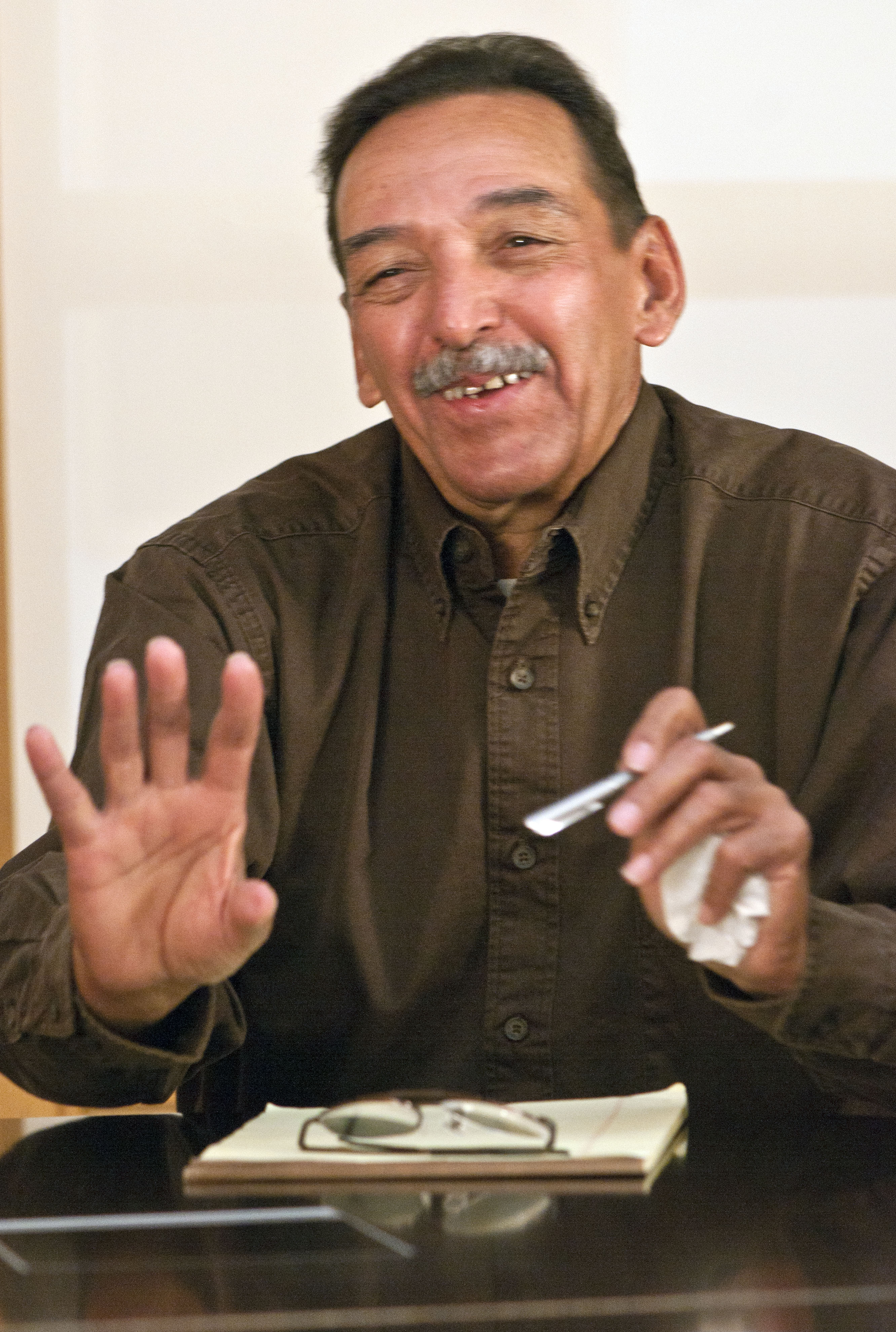
Richard Moore, 2011.

Richard Moore (born 1946) is an American environmental and social justice activist who is recognized for his work in advocating for environmental equity and community health. He was born in Harrisburg, Pennsylvania and is now based in Albuquerque, New Mexico.

== Career ==
Richard Moore has contributed significantly to grassroots initiatives focused on environmental and public health issues. His work has included fostering collaboration among communities, policymakers, and environmental organizations to address environmental justice concerns, with a particular focus on accountability for polluters and protecting vulnerable populations.

Richard Moore is currently the co-coordinator for Los Jardines Institute, as well as a member of the Environmental Justice & Health Alliance for Chemical Policy Reform. This alliance advocates for stronger chemical policies. He served as the executive director of Southwest Network for Environmental and Economic Justice (SNEEJ), from 1993 to 2010, when he then transitioned to senior advisor. Richard currently serves as the Co-Chair of the inaugural White House Environmental Justice Advisory Council (WHEJAC). He also served on the Environmental Protection Agency's (EPA) National Environmental Justice Advisory Council (NEJAC), where he was the first elected Chair in 1993. He is also Co-Founder and Board Member of Just Transition Alliance and a Board Member of Coming Clean, Inc.

== Los Jardines Institute ==
Based in Albuquerque, New Mexico, Los Jardines Institute (LJI) and also known as The Gardens Institute was established to create and support healthy and sustainable communities and workplaces. "The Institute honors land-based and grassroots ways of knowing in the places where we live, work, play, pray, and go to school."

LJI helped develop the Environmental Justice Health Association (EJHA), a national collaboration of Environmental Justice grassroots organizations linked with Coming Clean. These groups strive to reform the chemical and energy industries so that they are no longer a source of harm. The Campaign for Healthier Solutions is a nationwide initiative being developed by the EJHA to raise awareness of the high levels of toxicity found in Dollar Store items, especially those targeted towards children.

== Black Berets ==
In 1969, a group of Albuquerque activists founded the Black Berets. Richard Moore, Joaquín Luján, Plácido Salazar, Marvin García, Richard Sawtelle, Santiago Maestas, Nita Luna, José Soler, and a priest named Father Luis Jaramillo were the initial members. Although two members, Richard Moore and José Soler, were of Puerto Rican ancestry, the majority of the membership was Chicanos from New Mexico. According to Moore the people of New Mexico wanted protection from the new activist group in the late 1960s when police violence was a major problem. Moore stated in an interview, "They were shooting and beating our people all over the city." Moore also stated, "We had to deal with unbelievable police persecution." The Black Berets also established their own community centers as a first step toward establishing counter-institutions. El Mestizo, situated at 829 Isleta SW in the South Valley, was the first facility, and another was established in Duranes. These facilities offered the group meeting spaces, activities, as well as food and clothing distribution.

== Awards ==
National Health Care Association Recognition (2016): Moore was honored by the National Health Care Association for his efforts in grassroots leadership and dedication to communities health. This award showed off his ability to bring attention to environmental and public health issues.

TCF’s 2023 Peter A.A. Berle Environmental Integrity Awards: Moore was recognized for his work in the fight for environmental equity and his leadership in pushing the nation’s environmental policies and institutions to provide justice for low-income communities and marginalized communities in the United States.

Environmental Health Hero (2016): Moore attended the national CleanMed conference in Dallas, Texas, and was given the "Environmental Health Hero Award," which is the highest honor given by Health Care Without Harm. Richard received this award for his long lasting support for environmental justice as well as his "work with local healthcare clinics in supplying fresh organic produce to low-income patients."
