= Pam Tau Lee =

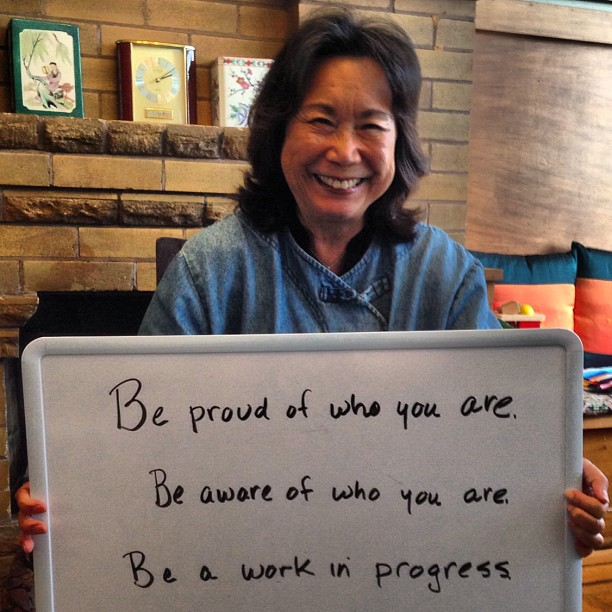
Pam Tau Lee, 2013.

Pam Tau Lee (born 1948) is an American labor and environmental justice advocate. She is fourth generation Chinese-American and was born in Northern California. Her work focuses on challenges faced by Asian-American restaurant and hotel workers in San Francisco's Chinatown. She worked for 20 years at University of California Berkeley's Center for Occupational and Environmental Health and has 10 years of experience as an organizer with Hotel Employees Restaurant Employees (HERE) Union Local 2.

Pam Tau Lee is a co-founder of numerous organizations including the Chinese Progressive Association, the Asian Pacific Environmental Network (APEN), and the Just Transition Alliance, where she is currently a board member.

== Career ==
In 1972, Pam Tau Lee joined the San Francisco I Wor Kuen (IWK). This organization was inspired by the Black Panther Party and composed of Asian American youths in opposition to economic exploitation, racism, and misogyny. She became active in the anti-imperialist struggle that critiqued American involvement in Asian, including the U.S.'s role in the Vietnam War.

=== San Francisco's International Hotel ===
During the early 1900s Filipino and Chinese immigrants began settling in areas around San Francisco's Chinatown. By the 1950s, this community had developed an area known as “Manilatown”, which included the International Hotel. The hotel was home to many elderly Filipino and Chinese immigrants. In 1968, the hotel was sold, resulting in many residents facing eviction. Pam Tau Lee participated in the grass-roots anti-eviction movement that resulted. Nonetheless, the residents were evicted in 1977, and the International Hotel was demolished in 1979.

=== First National People of Color Environmental Leadership Summit ===
In 1991, while working in environmental health and safety at the UC Berkeley School of Public Health, Tau Lee attended the First National People of Color Environmental Leadership Summit in Washington D.C. The summit focused on environmental racism. Tau Lee submitted a paper to the summit's policy group on occupational health and safety for people of color. Summit participants created the Preamble and Principles of Environmental Justice. This summit and its declaration were partly responsible for influencing President Bill Clinton's to create Executive Order 12898 - Federal Actions to Address Environmental Justice in Minority Populations and Low-Income Populations, which mandated federal agencies to consider how their policies would impact environmental and human health of minority and low-income populations.

=== Oil, Chemical Atomic Workers' Union ===
In the late 1990s, while working as a workplace and environmental health and safety trainer for the Asian Pacific Environmental Network, Tau Lee was invited to work on a project in collaboration with the Oil, Chemical Atomic Workers' Union (OCAW) and Just Transition to draft public policy for occupational safety and environmental stewardship. She worked to connect OCAW members with leading environmental justice groups such as the Southwest Network for Economic and Environmental Justice, Southwest Public Workers Union, Indigenous Environmental Network, and the Southern Organizing Project. This project spanned across Alabama, Arizona, and Oklahoma and helped those affected by environmental hazards to be directly involved in the drafting of legislation.

=== Chinese Progressive Association ===
Pam Tau Lee's work with the Chinese Progressive Association (CPA) addressed working conditions for Chinese immigrants employed in the restaurant industry in San Francisco. In 2007, the CPA formed a partnership with UC Berkeley School of Public Health and its Labor Occupational Health Program. Together they engaged in a research project and campaign aimed at addressing workplace conditions for Chinese immigrants. This was a participatory research project involving focus groups and surveys of over 400 Chinatown restaurant workers from over 100 of the restaurants in the area. The research identified work-related issues such as wage theft, injuries, and violations of minimum wage. Workers used the findings to apply pressure on their employers that, for some, resulted in being paid back wages. Many of these workers took on more active roles in the community, partnering with the CPA on campaigns for political elections and participating in demonstrations promoting the rights of immigrant workers.

As a result of this research, the CPA partnered with the San Francisco Progressive Workers Alliance (PWA) to introduce the San Francisco Wage Theft Protection Ordinance. This ordinance aimed to improve the processing times regarding claims of labor violations and to increase employer accountability in the face of said violations. The ordinance also called for increased education for employees of their workplace rights and enhanced protections against retaliation from their employer for claims of labor violations. This ordinance was passed into law by then Mayor Ed Lee in 2011.
