= National Domestic Workers Alliance =

American labor advocacy organization

- Formation: 2007; 19 years ago
- President: Ai-jen Poo
- Executive Director: Jenn Stowe
- Director of Strategy & Partnerships: Alicia Garza
- Website: www.domesticworkers.org

The National Domestic Workers Alliance (NDWA) is an advocacy organization promoting the rights of domestic workers in the United States. Founded in 2007, the organization is made up of 4 local chapters and 63 affiliate organizations around the country, along with thousands of individual members. Its work advocates for low-income laborers in the context of broader social justice issues, including immigration reform, domestic violence, and more recently the #MeToo movement and the COVID-19 pandemic.

The NDWA has established worker- owned training programs that intend to help domestic workers learn and defend their rights, as well as understand how governments and employers benefit from their labor and migration. The organization has become a structure for domestic workers to organize and address their living and working conditions, with domestic workers holding direct-leadership within the alliance.

== Background ==
There are approximately two million domestic workers in the US, most of whom are immigrants and women of color. Domestic workers include nannies, housekeepers and home care workers who assist the elderly or people with disabilities. Most workers make less than 13 dollars an hour.

Domestic workers have historically organized to end their exclusion from employment protections that were institutionalized from the New Deal of the 1930s. At the time, domestic workers were not incorporated into the protections of the New Deal. Some provisions that they were excluded from were protection from national employment provisions, including overtime protection, the minimum wage, union organizing, and harassment and discrimination protections.

The official establishment of the National Domestic Workers Alliance took place in the U.S Social Forum in Atlanta, Georgia, in June 2007. This forum was a national coordination of domestic workers who gathered to address their working conditions. The NDWA formed in order to organize with the collective interest of establishing changes to the domestic working conditions. The NDWA collaborates with a range of partners in order to collect support and to expand the reach of their impact.

Since 2010, the National Domestic Workers alliance has engaged in coalition building and legislative advocacy for change in industry standards. A major contributing outcome to this framework was their support for a Domestic Workers Bill of Rights, at state and local levels. These laws have worked to address historical exclusion in labor protections of domestic workers by including overtime pay, one day off per week, and protection under state human rights laws. Provisions that addressed state human rights laws include formal employment agreements, termination and notice requirements and severance for live-in workers, limits on employee deductions from food and lodging, government infrastructure for enforcement, and inclusion in state occupational health and safety protections.

A version of this Bill of Rights was enacted in New York in 2010 with the support of legislative advocacy by the NDWA. Similar legislation was introduced in California in 2013. Since then, ten other states have passed similar laws in addition to cities like Seattle, Washington D.C., and Philadelphia.

Research has suggested that the enactment of these bills have influenced reduction in overtime several years after it was passed, without negatively impacting earnings. The specific impact of these reduction in hours may vary depending on a workers employment arrangement, occupation, and US citizenship.

In 2024, the NDWA presented a black domestic workers through family portraits entitled The Legacy of Care, A Portrait Series, shot by Braylen Dion.

In September 2025, the NDWA along with the ACLU submitted comments to the United States Department of Labor opposing the potential change in policy to the Fair Labor Standards Act (FLSA). The potential policy changes would remove minimum wage and overtime protections for domestic workers.

== Leadership ==
The National Domestic Workers Alliance is led by President Ai-jen Poo. When Poo was studying at Columbia, she started volunteering with the Committee Against Anti-Asian Violence, where she became aware of the overlooked needs of domestic workers.In 2014, she was awarded a MacArthur fellowship. Poo used the funds of to award in order to help launch the Dorothy Bolden Fellowship. This fellowship provides domestic workers the opportunity to take on leadership roles within the NDWA.

Ai-Jen Poo has verbalized a connection between the conditions of domestic workers with the responsibilities of democracy and the importance of collective narrative. She has stated that with collective empowerment and the power of narrative, domestic workers and their allies can enact social change.

Jenn Stowe is the executive director of the National Domestic Workers Alliance.

Alicia Garza, who co-founded the Black Lives Matter network, is the Director of Strategy and Partnerships at the National Domestic Workers Alliance.
