= St. Stephen's Episcopal School (Austin, Texas) =

Private pre school in Austin, Texas, US

Location
- 6500 St. Stephen's Drive; Austin, Texas 78746; United States; 30°19′49.04″N 97°48′58.78″W

Information
- Type: Private, Boarding, Day
- Religious affiliation: Christian
- Denomination: Episcopalian
- Founded: 1950
- Founder: The Rt. Rev. John E. Hines
- Authority: Episcopal Diocese of Texas
- CEEB code: 440315
- Chairperson: The Rt. Rev. Kathryn Ryan
- Head of school: Chris Gunnin
- Faculty: 75
- Grades: 6‒12
- Gender: Coed
- Enrollment: 694
- Average class size: 16
- Student to teacher ratio: 14:1
- Education system: College Preparatory
- Campus size: 370 acres (150 ha)
- Campus type: Suburban
- Colors: Purple and Red
- Athletics: Various
- Athletics conference: Southwest Preparatory Conference Division II
- Mascot: Spartans
- Team name: Spartans
- Endowment: $45 million
- Website: sstx.org

St. Stephen's Episcopal School is a private coeducational preparatory boarding and day school in Austin, Texas. Enrollment for the 2019–20 academic year is approximately 694, with 487 students in grades 9–12 and 207 in grades 6–8. Of the school's 694 students, 523 are day students and 171 are boarding students. The school's campus overlooks Lake Austin and is spread across 370 acres (1.5 km^{2}) of the Texas Hill Country. The school is accredited by The Association of Boarding Schools, Independent Schools Association of the Southwest, the Southwestern Association of Independent Schools, the National Association of Episcopal Schools, the National Association of Independent Schools, National Association for College Admission Counseling, and the Association of College Counselors in Independent Schools.

== History ==
Bishop John E. Hines of the Episcopal Diocese of Texas founded St. Stephen's Episcopal School in 1950. Hines believed girls should have equal access to education, and St. Stephen's was the first Episcopalian co-educational boarding school in the United States. The school also played a part in the 20th-century Civil Rights Movement as the first integrated boarding school in the South.

== Governance ==
St. Stephen's has a board of trustees, including alumni and parents of former students. Day-to-day operations of the school are overseen by a head of school, who is appointed by the board of trustees with the consent of the Bishop of the Episcopal Diocese of Texas."ISAS Standards for Membership" (PDF). Summer 2019. The current headmaster, Christopher L. Gunnin, was appointed in 2016.

Currently there is a boarding program, with students supervised by a team of roughly 38 full-time staff, as well as proctors (junior and senior students selected by staff to serve as mentors).

== Religion ==
All faiths are welcomed, encouraged, accepted and celebrated at St. Stephen's Episcopal School. Chapel services are held in the early noons, in the form of a traditional Episcopalian worship service, sometimes featuring guest speakers and announcements. A weekly Sunday morning church service takes place during the school year, and boarding students are required to attend.

== Notable alumni ==
- Terrence Malick (1961) - Film director, screenwriter and producer
- Marilyn Buck (1965) - Marxist and feminist poet
- Charles C. Campbell (1966) - United States Army four-star general who served as the Commander of the U.S. Army Forces Command (FORCOM)
- Cecile Richards (1976) - Past President of Planned Parenthood and Planned Parenthood Action Fund
- Sarah Aubrey (1990) - Hollywood executive who has served as the Head of Original Content for HBO Max
- Blake Mycoskie (1995) - Founder of Toms Shoes
- Ross Ohlendorf (2001) - Major League Baseball pitcher
- Aaron Moten (2007) - Actor
- Sarafina El-Badry Nance (2011) - American Astrophysicist, analog astronaut, science communicator, women's health advocate, author
- Jarrett Allen (2016) - Basketball player for the NBA's Cleveland Cavaliers, selected to be an All Star in 2022; played for University of Texas
- Mikaila Ulmer (2022) - CEO of Me and the Bees
- Mikey Lopez (2011) - Retired professional soccer player
- Lukas Haas (1994) - Actor
