= Sarafina Nance =

American science communicator, astrophysics researcher

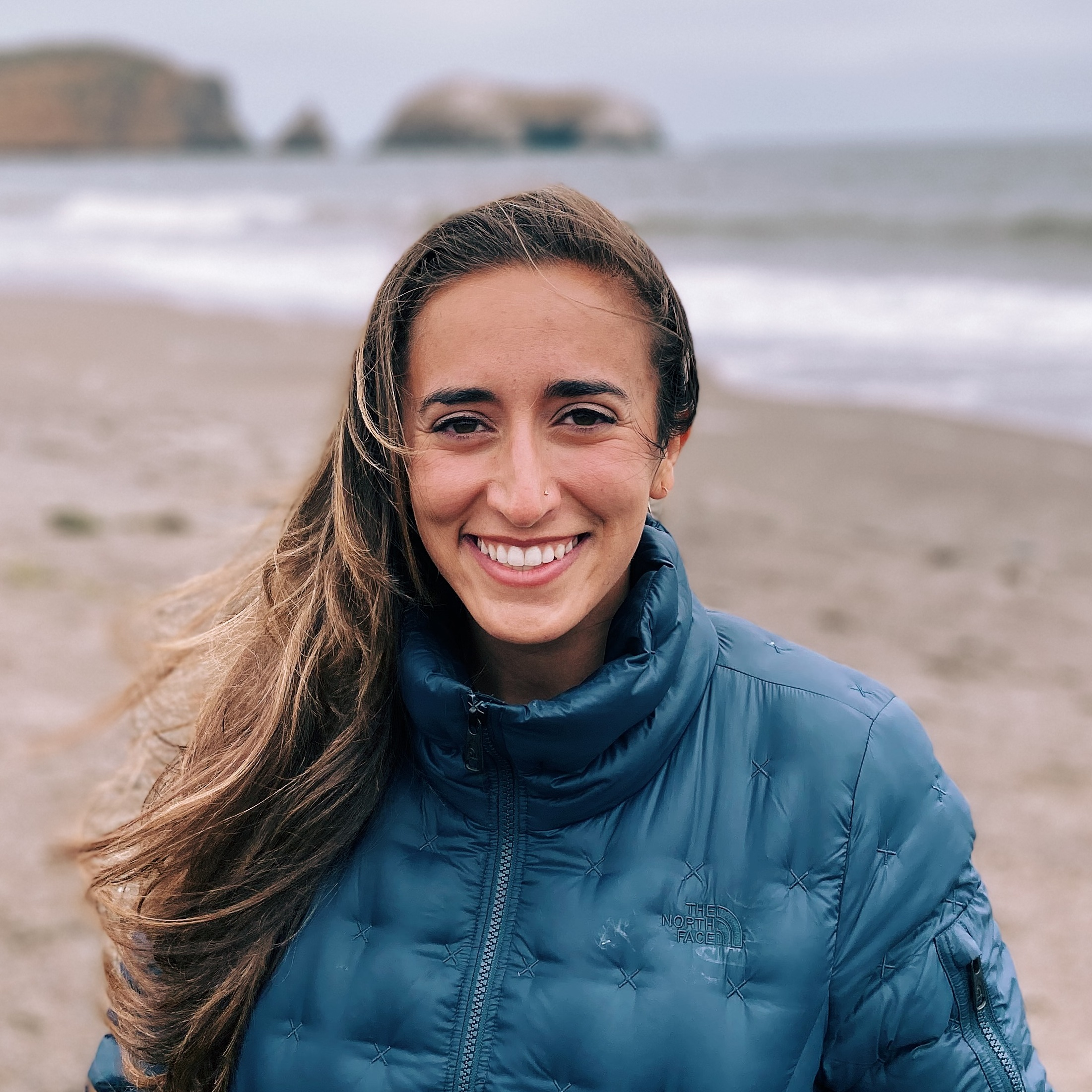
- Sarafina Nance in 2020
- Born: Sarafina El-Badry Nance; March 25, 1993 (age 33); Austin, Texas
- Education: St. Stephen's Episcopal School
- Alma mater: University of Texas at Austin (BS); University of California, Berkeley (MS, PhD)
- Occupation: Astrophysicist
- Scientific career
- Thesis: A Theoretical Investigation of Supernovae Progenitors (2016)
- Website: starafina.com

Sarafina El-Badry Nance is an Egyptian-American astrophysicist and science communicator. She was formerly a graduate student in the Department of Astronomy at the University of California, Berkeley and has now graduated. Her research investigates supernovae and their applications to cosmology. Nance is known for her use of social media, in particular Twitter, Instagram and LinkedIn where she discusses astrophysics and activism. She is also an advocate for women's health and science, technology, engineering, and mathematics (STEM). Her memoir Starstruck was published in 2023.

== Early life and education ==
Nance grew up in Austin, Texas. She became interested in the Solar System as a child, and used to listen to StarDate on the radio on her way home from school. She has said that her St. Stephen's Episcopal School's high school physics teacher, Frank Mikan, encouraged her love of space science.

In 2016, Nance received a dual Bachelor of Science (BS) degree in physics and astronomy from the University of Texas at Austin in 2016. Her undergraduate honors thesis was on A Theoretical Investigation of Supernovae Progenitors and advised by J. Craig Wheeler. There she used asteroseismology to understand stars that were about to undergo a supernova. Her research focussed on Betelgeuse. While an undergraduate student at Austin, Nance was named a Dean's Honour scholarship and took part in a National Science Foundation (NSF) summer program at Harvard University.

In 2017, Nance moved to the University of California, Berkeley for her graduate studies, where she investigates supernovae and uses them as a means to study both the make-up and ultimate fate of the universe. Here she earned an Master of Science (MS) degree in astronomy, before beginning a doctoral programme. In particular, Nance studies the evolutionary state of Betelgeuse. She works with the Lawrence Berkeley National Laboratory Centre for Computational Cosmology to use supercomputers to build models of the explosions of supernovae in their final stages.

== Career and research ==
In March 2021, Nance was listed by Forbes magazine as one of 30 inspirational women as part of Women's History Month.

=== Science communication ===
During the first year of her undergraduate degree Nance worked as an intern at the McDonald Observatory. After starting her doctoral degree, Nance took to her science communication online. One of her viral tweets on Twitter, which highlighted how important failure was in science, was picked up by Sundar Pichai.

Nance is an activist for women's health. In her early 20s it was identified that she had inherited the BRCA2 gene from her father, which is known to be a predictor of breast cancer. Nance used a crowdfunding campaign to raise money to cover the cost of a double mastectomy, and her social media platform to advocate for early and frequent testing as well as preventive medicine. After searching for the best local surgeons, Nance identified Anne Peled, a Californian reconstructive surgeon who was also a survivor of breast cancer. Nance underwent the surgery in 2019.

On January 15, 2021, Seeker released the internet television astronomy series Constellations, hosted by Nance.

Nance's memoir Starstruck was published in 2023. which explains various aspects of astronomy alongside telling her experiences growing up and entering a career in astronomy.

=== Selected publications ===
According to Google Scholar and Scopus, her most cited publications include:

- The Betelgeuse Project: constraints from rotation
- The Betelgeuse Project II: asteroseismology
