= Camila María Concepción =

American screenwriter and transgender rights activist (1991–2020)

- Born: December 20, 1991; Arcadia, California, U.S.
- Died: February 21, 2020 (aged 28); Los Angeles, California, U.S.
- Resting place: Holy Cross Catholic Cemetery; Pomona, California, U.S.
- Education: Yale University
- Occupations: screenwriter; activist

Camila María Concepción (December 20, 1991 – February 21, 2020) was an American screenwriter and transgender rights activist.

== Biography ==
Concepción was born in California and grew up in Inland Empire and El Monte. She graduated from Yale University with a degree in American Studies, writing her prizewinning senior thesis on the relationship between American “minority” literature and theories of decolonization.

Concepción was an assistant writer for the 2020 Netflix comedy-drama original series Gentefied, helping write the ninth episode "Protest Tacos", directed by Andrew Ahn. She was also a staff writer on Netflix's 2019 zombie comedy-drama series Daybreak. Her artistic inspirations were Gloria E. Anzaldúa, Octavia Butler, Paul Auster, butterflies, and Cher Horowitz.

Concepción was a prolific writer and an active Latina transgender rights activist. She was represented by United Talent Agency (UTA) and took part in Joey Soloway's Time's Up 50/50 by 2020 Initiative, advocating for more diverse representation in the entertainment industry. In 2018, she spoke about transgender representation in the media at the United State of Women Summit.

She died by suicide on February 21, 2020, in Hollywood. Representatives for Netflix, the show Gentefied, and others who had worked with her expressed their condolences.
