= George Goehl =

HumanRights

- Born: February 2, 1969 (age 56); Columbus, Ohio, U.S.
- Education: Indiana University
- Occupation(s): Community organizer, nonprofit executive
- Known for: Former Director, People's Action
- Spouse: Ai-jen Poo
- Website: https://georgegoehl.org/

George Goehl (born February 2, 1969) is an American community organizer, activist and former executive director of People's Action, an organization formed through the merger of five national organizations into one of the largest, with more than a million volunteers and 600 paid organizers, working for poor and working-class people in the United States. His efforts have helped to craft city, state, and federal campaigns on issues that range from outlawing predatory lending, advancing immigration reform, multiracial organizing in rural communities and defining co-governing. He also sits on the board of The Solutions Project and Equal Voice Action.

== Career ==
Goehl began his organizing career as the founding president of the Coalition of Low-Income and Homeless Citizens. He later began working for National People's Action where he designed a national campaign to pressure HUD to reform their Federal Housing Administration home loan program which resulted in the establishment of the Credit Watch Program to hold lenders accountable for excessive defaults on FHA-insured mortgages.

In 2012, Goehl co-organized the 99% Spring, an effort with roots in the Occupy Wall Street movement in 2011. In 2018, as executive director of People's Action, he co-sponsored a demonstration at the U.S.-Mexico border against the separation of immigrant families. The Guardian included Goehl as one of the "leaders of the grassroots resistance" of President Donald Trump.

Goehl has written for The Nation, The American Prospect, and Huffington Post.
