= Mikaila Ulmer =

American entrepreneur (born 2004)

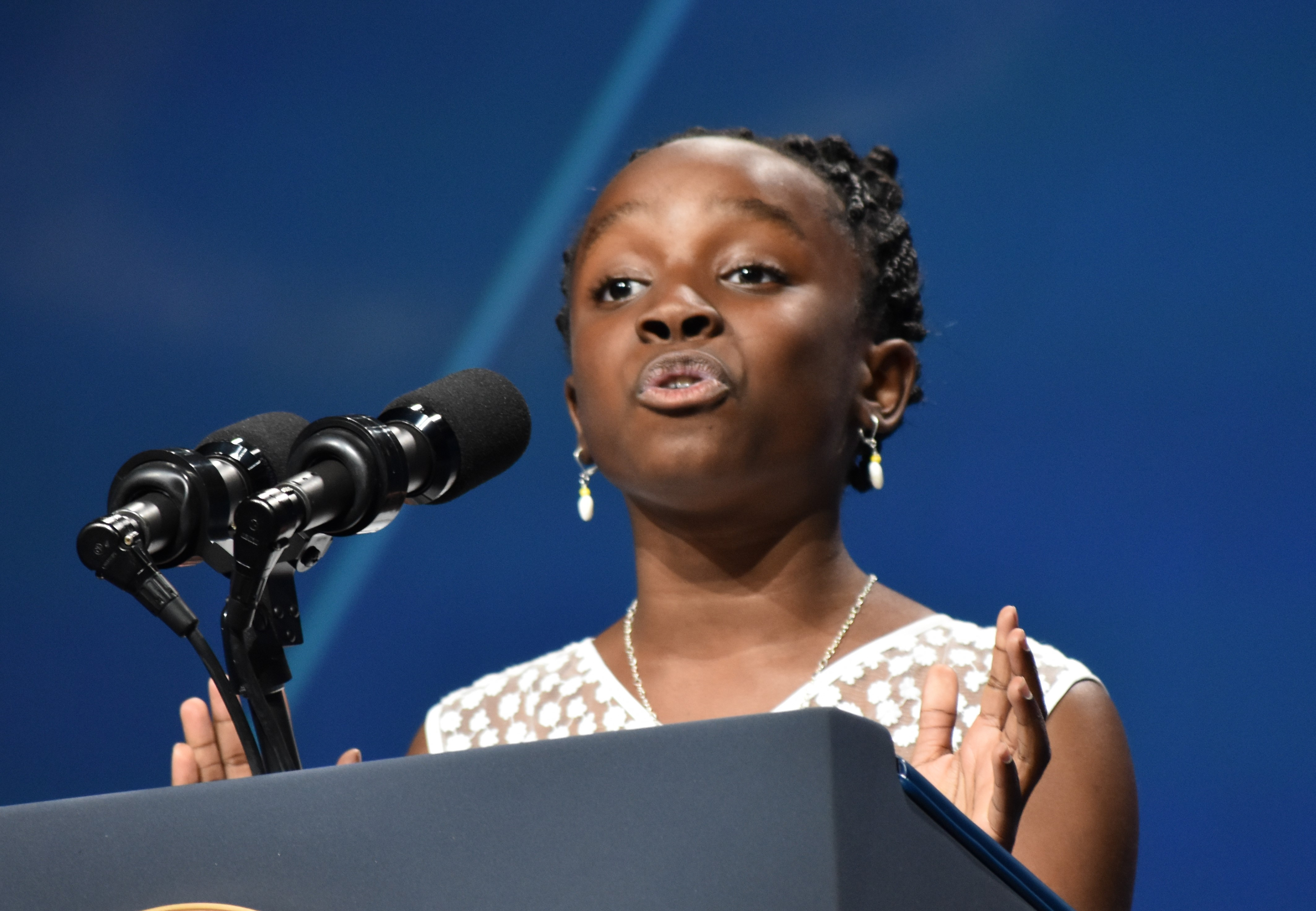
- Portrait by Anna Wilding in 2016
- Born: September 28, 2004 (age 21); Houston, Texas, U.S.
- Education: Emory University
- Occupations: Entrepreneur, student
- Known for: Teen Social Entrepreneur

Mikaila Ulmer (born September 28, 2004) is an American entrepreneur who started a lemonade business in Austin, Texas. Her lemonade is sold in over 1500 stores.

== Early life and career ==
Mikaila Ulmer was born in Houston, Texas. Her parents, D'Andra and Theo Ulmer, both have business degrees. She is from Austin, Texas, where she attended St. Stephen's Episcopal School. By 2009, Ulmer was in front of her house selling her lemonade inspired by her great-grandmother's 1940s recipe, using honey from local beekeepers which includes flaxseed. The lemonade sold well and she was asked by a local pizza shop to supply her product to it, which is how bottling her lemonade started. Since her humble beginnings, Mikaila has donated 10% of the profits to charities that are concerned with saving the bees. As the business grew her parents became involved. Mikaila is enrolled as a student at Emory University.

Ulmer appeared with her father on the television show Shark Tank in 2015 where she successfully received a $60,000 investment to support her growing business. Daymond John put up the money. Ulmer was invited that year to meet President Barack Obama at the White House.

Ulmer introduced Barack Obama at the United State of Women Summit in 2016. Obama called her "an amazing young lady". In 2017, her business received $800,000 as an investment made by a consortium of football players.

In 2017, her lemonade, "Me & The Bees Lemonade" was being sold in 500 American shops in 500,000 bottles a year.

In February 2020, Me & the Bees was in over 1,500 stores nationwide, including Whole Foods, Cost Plus World Market, Vitamin Cottage Natural Grocers, H-E-B, Kroger, and The Fresh Market. Me & the Bees has also expanded its product line to include lip balms made from bee's wax.
