= Ciiru Waithaka =

Kenyan serial entrepreneur

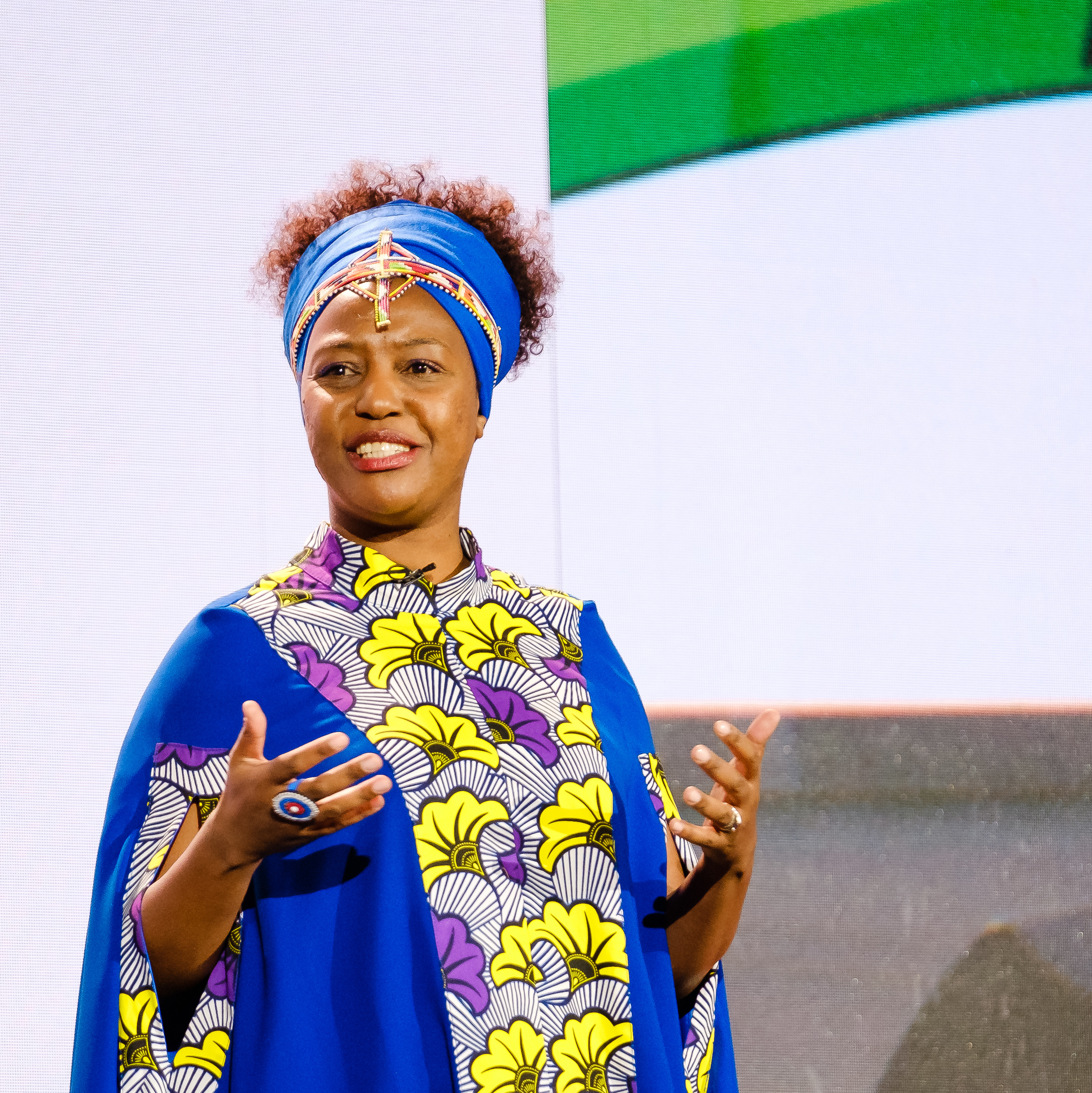
- Ciiru Waithaka at the UK-Africa Investment Summit in London in 2020
- Born: 23/02/1975
- Education: University of Glasgow
- Occupation: CEO
- Known for: Sustainable furniture production
- Spouse: Chiera Waithaka

Ciiru Waweru Waithaka is a Kenyan serial entrepreneur who co-founded and is the CEO of FunKidz. She has been recognised as a role model as her company recycles timber in Kenya for school furniture. Her company empowers women and manufactures sustainable products.

== Life ==
Waithaka was educated at the University of Glasgow and graduated in interior architecture. She spent ten years selling designed furniture in East Africa as "Amber Africa" to hotels and corporates.

Her new company was to design and make "Funkidz" school furniture. The furniture was intended to be made from timber and then sold in Kenya, but the country placed a ban on felling trees so there was no home produced timber. Her company rethought the problem and decided to use recycled timber. They obtained their timber at little or no cost and this enables them to pass on these savings to schools. In return for the low cost furniture her company asks the schools to commit to planting more trees.

In 2015 she attended events in Ireland, France and South Africa having been selected as a role model by Facebook, UNESCO and UN Women. She was frequently the only Kenyan invited to these international events.

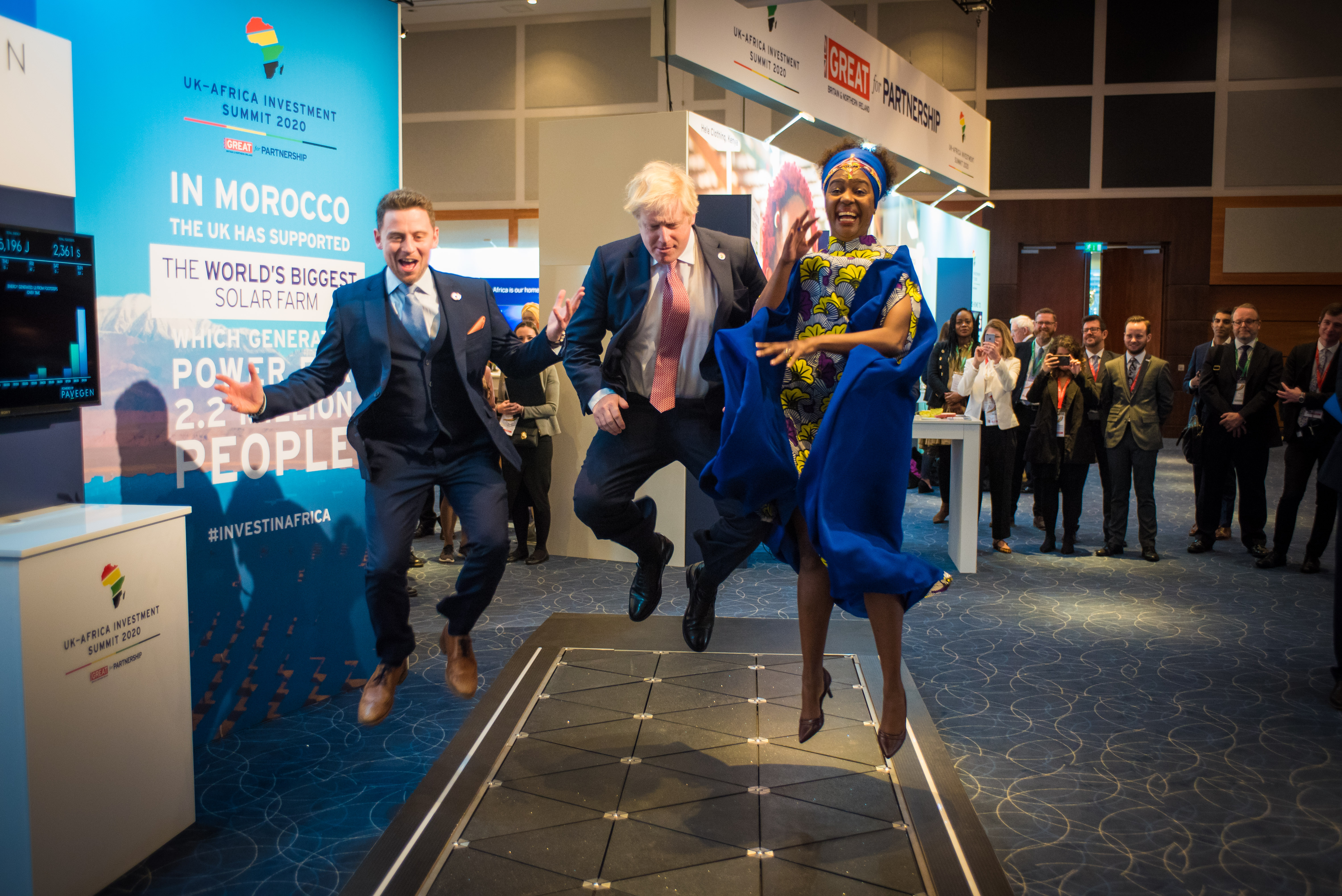
Another, Boris Johnson and Waithaka at a summit in 2020

In 2016 she was invited to attend the United State of Women Summit at the White House where Michelle Obama recognised their common ancestry and said "You Go Girl". Obama noted that Waithaka had doubled her production thanks to a loan from the Goldman Sachs' 10,000 Women campaign. Obama recognised her as a woman who was helping other women and families to follow her lead.

In 2019 she received recognition from both the Government of Kenya's Ministry of Environment and from the Kenya Association of Manufacturers. They recognised that she was encouraging women in manufacturing as well and producing goods sustainably.

In 2023 she provided a location for an evening for visiting US actress Salma Hayek with Kennedy Odede, Jessica Odede, Kirinyaga County's Governor Anne Waiguru and Minister for Health Hon. Susan Nakhumicha Wafula.

== Awards ==
- a 2016 award from Goldman Sachs for her work in Kidz Go Tech
- Women 4 Tech award, from GSMA in Barcelona in 2017.
- 2019 award from the Government of Kenya's Ministry of Environment.
- 2019 recognition by the Kenya Association of Manufacturers
