= Black Census Project =

The Black Census Project is a decentralized survey of historically underrepresented Black communities founded in 2018 by Alicia Garza, founder of the Black Futures Lab and co-founder of Black Lives Matter. The goals of the Black Census Project are to build black political power by giving black communities a voice to profess the issues they care about the most and life experiences that have not been well documented by the United States Census and other polling data. In order to build their data gathering infrastructure, they are partnering with Color of Change, 30 grass-roots organizations, and investing over $500 million to train 100 black organizers in 20 states to efficiently gather survey results. Survey questions intend to gather data on the respondents political affiliations, key issues, trust in public and private entities, and common experiences. In their first year, the Black Census Project reached over 31,000 people from all 50 states, making them the largest survey of Black Americans since the Reconstruction era.

== Founding and goals ==
The Black Census Project was created based on a variety of both social and polling problems that were identified within the Black community regarding their sentiments and voice in government. One issue that the project seeks to combat is the alleged misrepresentation of surveys with small respondents as a large poll of the entire Black voter population. The project also holds that the Democratic Party assumes that Black voters will show out to vote for left-wing candidates, which is why one of their goals is to increase the amount of campaign funds that are allocated to predominantly Black communities. In addition, the founders wanted to find differences between urban and rural communities, as well as more personal experiences that are common throughout.

== Data gathering processes ==
The Black Census Project set out with the goal of reaching 200,000 respondents in order to reach their goals and solve the problems that they identified. Since they began as a small startup, their parent organization, the Black Futures Lab, partnered with Color of Change and 30 grass-roots organization in order to train over 100 organizers to go into the communities and compile data from respondents. The 20 states that were targeted by the organization's funding were identified as containing communities that were commonly left out of polling data and the United States Census. Survey questions included topics such as political views, which issues they felt were the most important, how much they trusted public and private entities, and some questions sought to look deeper into their personal experiences. The project also identified that some voters have major privacy regarding the US Census. For example, individuals who have problems with the law are concerned about giving identifiable information as they fear being pursued. Another example of this is undocumented immigrants fearing they may be deported. In order to combat these privacy concerns, it was made optional to give your name and contact information only if you chose to be followed up with for the next survey cycle.

== Results ==
In 2018, the Black Census Project found that the biggest issue that faced Black Americans was economic insecurity. According to the data, 90% of respondents stated that their wages were too low to support a family. Among respondents who were the most politically active, 97% of them also stated that their wages were too low to support a family. In addition, the most distrusted entities among respondents were large corporations, the federal government, and the police. On the other hand, the most trusted entities among respondents were small businesses, black elected officials, and journalists.

In total, the survey accumulated over 31,000 responses in 2018. Of these, 76% of respondents had voted in the 2016 elections and 40% had helped other vote in that election. It was also seen that 75% of cisgender men supported ending violence against trans women, which was a top 5 issue among the entire surveyed population. The most consistently important policies that were viewed positively were raising the minimum wage, increases taxes on the wealthiest 1%, and providing housing, health care, and child care for low-income families. Most black voters who were surveyed also believed that politicians only cared about big businesses, rich people, and white people. Another common theme was that black voters generally did not have pollsters, the media, or political campaigns ask them what their daily lives was like.
