= Asian Pacific Environmental Network =

U.S. non-profit organization

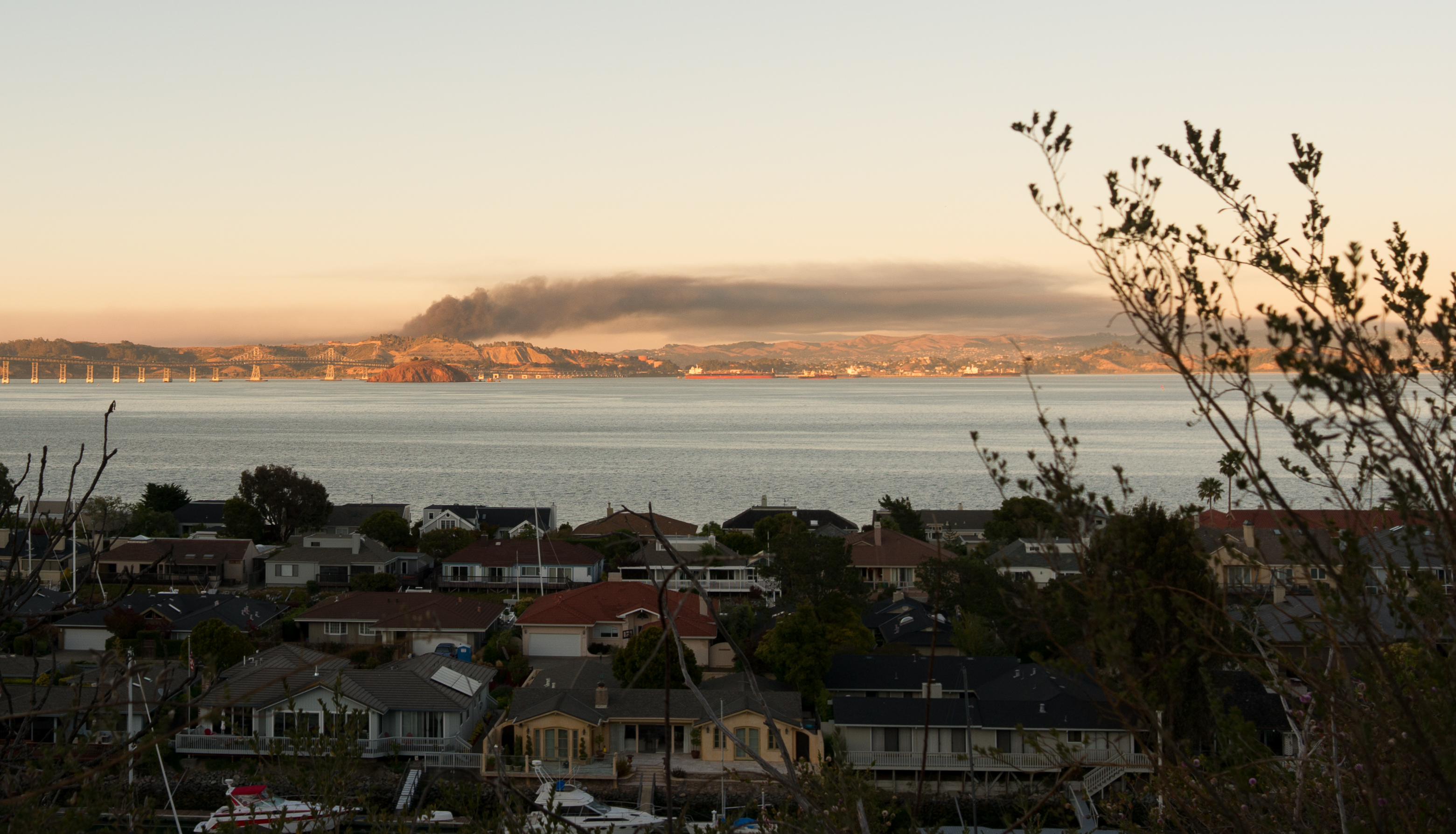
Richmond Refinery Accident: Fire 2012 -02

The Asian Pacific Environmental Network (APEN) is an environmental justice organization located on the west coast of California, specifically in Richmond, Oakland, and Wilmington, California. APEN is an active member of the California Environmental Justice Alliance and has been involved with campaigns that advocate for just urban environments. APEN has expanded the framework of an environmental organization by incorporating biological, industrial, civil and social justice aspects into an effort that works to develop eco-friendly landscapes for the communities that they represent. They are involved with environmental issues surrounding the opposition of toxic waste infrastructure and they also lead campaigns for Asian Pacific Americans (AAPI) communities lacking adequate housing and climate solutions in sacrifice zones which consists of locations that sit on or are near hazardous waste sites.

== Origins ==
Asian Pacific Environmental Network was created in 1993 by AAPI representatives who had attended the 1991 First National People of Color Environmental Justice Leadership Summit. Delegates such as Peggy Saika, Pam Tau Lee, and Miya Yoshitani returned from the 1991 summit having noticed little representation of AAPI people. Pam Tau Lee and Peggy Saika were the drivers in the organizing and sourcing of AAPI leaders who shared a vision to bring more environmental consciousness to the AAPI community. Pam Tau Lee, Peggy Saika, and Miya Yoshitani led recruitments to envision APEN which then led to its formation in 1993 and sister organizations that work within AAPI communities. APEN has also expanded its network by establishing the Laotian Organizing Project (LOP) as a generational inter-ethnic community lead organization as well as "Power in Asians Organizing" which organizes low-income residence in Oakland. APEN has also established the Asian Youth Advocates (AYA), a youth program that fosters leadership from AAPI communities in California. APEN also created an Intergenerational Leadership program to support and encourage more young women to get involved with these issues.

Map showing the counties where APEN works

== Work ==
APEN works in Richmond which has over 350 chemical companies, and hazardous waste sites including the 2 contaminated federal Superfund locations and they also address asthma and air pollution levels. APEN and its sister organizations have stopped some of Chevron's expansion initiatives and have worked to reallocate Chevron payouts through community benefits agreements and settlements from accidents.

APEN has been engaged in legal oppositions to oil and industrial corporations, advocating for Just Cause eviction protections and advocating for environmental initiatives since 1993. APEN has been a part of campaigns to give more control to tenants by working to pass the Tenant Opportunity to Purchase Act. In 2002, APEN established an effort called "Power in Asians Organizing" which mobilized to win affordable housing units and stop mass evictions in Oakland. Additionally, APEN’s goal of ensuring environmental justice extended into a No Coal In Richmond coalition in 2020. This initiative ended up prohibiting the storage and exportation of coal and petroleum in Richmond, California. In 2021, APEN lead the Reimagining Public Safety Task Force in Richmond, which re-allocated $10 million towards housing and food access to Richmond and Oakland residents. APEN has also expanded linguistic equity by integrating a multilingual warning system which implemented health advisory notifications from refinery accidents to Contra Costa County.

APEN works with cities across California to invest in AAPI infrastructure to build community resiliency to climate change. A major part of this advocacy surrounds tenant control and protection measures in both health and economic aspects. To aid in mitigating environmental impacts on communities, APEN is installing sustainable energy sources within low-income communities to ensure that individuals do not have to relocate due to an inability to afford basic needs. Additionally, this self-sustaining form of energy will enable communities to stay together and continue to advocate for change in minority and low-income communities. Through the Inflation Reduction Act, APEN is 1 of the 11 EPA-appointed grant-makers that can distribute federal funds to locally-led environmental projects that address climate action

== See also ==
- Pam Tau Lee
