= Ai-jen Poo =

American labor activist (born 1974)

- 蒲艾真
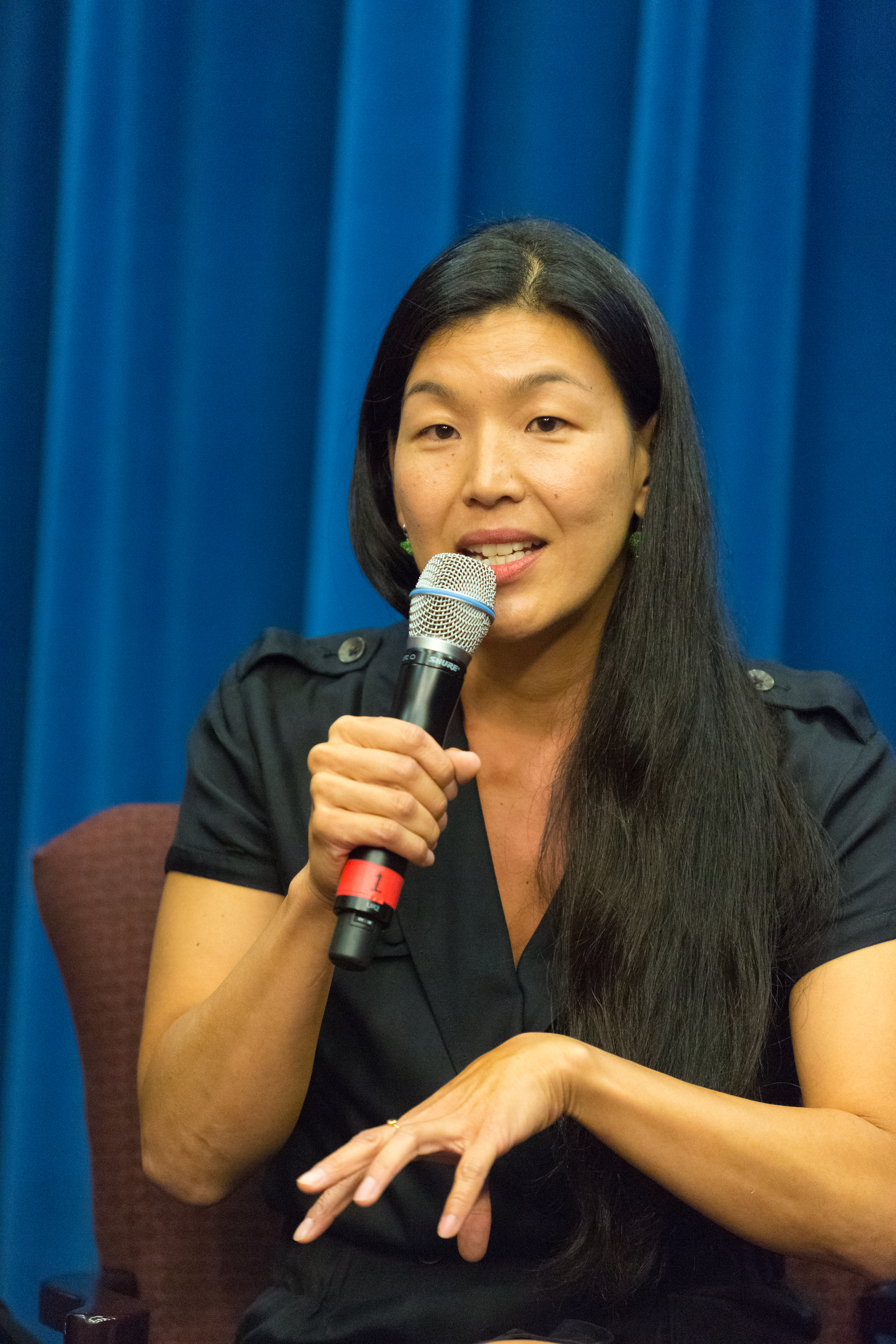
- Born: 1974 (age 51–52); Pittsburgh, Pennsylvania, U.S.
- Education: Columbia University (BA)
- Political party: Democratic
- Spouse: George Goehl
- Relatives: Mu-ming Poo (father)
- Awards: MacArthur Fellowship

Ai-jen Poo (/ˌaɪ dʒɛn ˈpuː/, Chinese: 蒲艾真; pinyin: Pú Àizhēn; born 1974) is an American labor activist. She is the president of the National Domestic Workers Alliance. She is also the director of Caring Across Generations, a national coalition of 200 advocacy organizations working to transform the long-term care system in the US, with a focus on the needs of aging Americans, people with disabilities, and their caregivers.

She is a 2014 recipient of the MacArthur "Genius" Award. In February 2015, the New Press released her book, The Age of Dignity: Preparing for the Elder Boom in a Changing America. She has been mentioned as a potential future Secretary of Labor under a Democratic administration.

== Biography ==
Ai-jen Poo was born to Taiwanese American parents. Her father, Mu-ming Poo, is a neuroscientist and one-time political activist who emigrated from Taiwan in the 1970s. Her mother Wen-jen Hwu has a Ph.D. in chemistry as well as an M.D., and was an oncologist at two of the top cancer centers in Taiwan.

Poo was born in Pittsburgh, and graduated from Phillips Academy in 1992 and Columbia University, where she was one of more than 100 students who occupied the rotunda in Low Library; this occupation led to the creation of Columbia's Center for the Study of Ethnicity and Race.

Post graduation, she worked for an Asian community organization in New York leading her to interview women who included housekeepers from Hong Kong, which expanded to hearing stories from African, Latin American, and Caribbean domestic workers. Her findings included domestic workers that had experienced labor rights violations, racism, and violence, but also "in the face of all kinds of indignities, domestic workers take so much pride in their work and love the children they care for". Through her interviews, she began to see the vast income inequality present between domestic workers and their employers who frequently make 6 figure incomes.

Later into her career, she was named one of Time 100's list of influential people in Time magazine in 2012. She attended the 75th Golden Globe Awards in 2018 as a guest of Meryl Streep.

== Domestic Workers United ==
Ai-jen Poo began organizing domestic workers in 1996, with CAAAV Organizing Asian Communities, also known as the Committee Against Anti-Asian Violence. She is the founder and former lead organizer of Domestic Workers United, an organization of Caribbean, Latina, and African nannies, housekeepers, and elderly caregivers in New York that organizes for "power, respect, and fair labor standards".

By 2007, the Domestic Workers United formed the National Domestic Workers Alliance (NDWA) alongside other organizations. In 2010, Domestic Workers United was instrumental in New York state passing the Domestic Workers Bill of Rights into law; this law was the first in the United States to guarantee domestic workers basic labor protections such as overtime pay, three days' paid leave, and legal protections from harassment and discrimination. When asked about her thoughts on hiring a domestic worker for herself, she said "No...My job is to represent domestics’ interests, and it might be hard to do that as an employer. Besides, I couldn’t handle that mixture of intimacy and inequality".

DWU helped to organize the first national meeting of domestic worker organizations at the US Social Forum in 2007, which resulted in the formation of the National Domestic Workers Alliance that year. She has been NDWA's director since April 2010. In 2011, Ai-jen Poo helped launch Caring Across Generations.

== Supermajority ==
In the spring of 2019, Poo cofounded the group Supermajority with Cecile Richards and Alicia Garza. The group "aims to train and mobilize 2 million women over the next year to become organizers, activists, and leaders ahead of the 2020 election" to create a "multiracial, intergenerational movement for women's equity". The main goal of Supermajority is to "push politicians to adopt an agenda akin to what Richards called 'a women's new deal,'" with issues like "voting rights, gun control, paid family leave, equal pay, and others" viewed as "soft issues" being seen as "issues that impact everyone". In addition, they intend to educate women about issues such as "pay equity and affordable child care, as well as inform them on "basic organizing skills like voter registration". In the 2020 election, cofounder Richards says "[the group will be successful] if 54% of the voters in this country are women and if we are able to insert into this country the issues that women care about and elect a president who's committed to doing something about them."

== Awards ==
She has received the Open Society Institute Community Fellowship, the Union Square Award, the Leadership for a Changing World Award, the Ernest de Maio Award from the Labor Research Association, the Woman of Vision Award from Ms. Foundation for Women, the Alston Bannerman Fellowship for Organizers of Color, the Twink Frey Visiting Scholar Fellowship at University of Michigan Center for the Education of Women, and the Prime Movers Fellowship. In honor of the 100th Anniversary of International Women's Day, Ai-jen was recognized by Women Deliver as one of 100 women internationally who are "delivering" for other women.

In 2009 she was named one of Crain's "40 Under 40" and Moves magazine's "Power Women". In 2010, the Feminist Press recognized her in their "40 Under 40" awards. In 2011 she was named one of Yes!'s Breakthrough 15, and received the Independent Sector's American Express NGen Leadership Award. In 2012, she was elected an Ashoka Fellow. That same year, she was also named one of the Time 100 in Time magazine, as well as one of Newsweek's "150 Women Who Shake the World".

In September 2014, she was one of 21 awarded a MacArthur Fellowship grant, the so-called "MacArthur genius grants". In 2017, she was awarded an honorary doctorate from the New School. She has written for The Huffington Post, The Guardian, and other news outlets.

== Literary Works ==
=== Books ===
- Poo, Ai-jen; Conrad, Ariane (November 15, 2016). Age of Dignity: Caring for a Changing America. New Press. ISBN 9781620970386. OCLC 910217632 – via WorldCat.org.

=== Critical studies, reviews, and biography ===
- Conrad, Ariane (January–February 2013). "A love to be reckoned with". Interview. Spirituality & Health. 15 (6): 74–79.
- Andrea Cristina Mercado; Ai-jen Poo Domestic Workers Organizing in the United States. AWID (Association for Women's Rights in Development), 2008. OCLC 833311952
