= Jacquelyn Campbell =

US nurse and advocate for victims of violence

- Born: August 26, 1946 (age 80)
- Education: Duke University, Wright State University, University of Rochester
- Known for: Work on domestic violence
- Awards: Elected to the Institute of Medicine in 2000
- Scientific career
- Fields: Nursing, public health
- Workplaces: Johns Hopkins School of Nursing
- Thesis: A nursing study of two explanatory models of women's responses to battering (1986)

Jacquelyn C. Campbell, PhD, MSN, RN, (born August 26, 1946) is an American academic nurse known for her research on domestic violence and violence against women, especially cases of such violence that end in homicide. She is professor and the Anna D. Wolf Chair at the Johns Hopkins School of Nursing. She is also the national program director for the Robert Wood Johnson Foundation's Nurse Faculty Scholars program.

== Work ==
In 1985, Campbell developed the Danger Assessment, a questionnaire that is among the first tools designed to assess a woman's risk of being killed by an abusive partner. It is also designed to give women more of a role in planning their own safety, and to give them more personalized help. She also developed the "Lethality Assessment Program", which is intended to be administered by police when they arrive at domestic violence incidents. The program has since been adopted by multiple police departments in Maryland. She helped design the ARC3 Survey, which provides universities a free way to measure the occurrences and effects of sexual assault on their campuses.

== Honors and awards ==
Campbell was elected to the Institute of Medicine in 2000, and is a member of its Board of Global Health. She is also a member of the American Academy of Nursing. She has been named a Pathfinder Distinguished Researcher by the National Institute of Nursing Research, and has received Outstanding Alumna and Distinguished Contributions to Nursing Science Awards from the Duke University School of Nursing, as well as the American Society of Criminology's Vollmer Award. She was also one of the 17 inaugural Gilman Scholars named by Johns Hopkins.

== Works ==
- Jacquelyn C Campbell's research while affiliated with Johns Hopkins University and other places (list) at ResearchGate
