= Cecile Richards =

American activist (1957–2025)

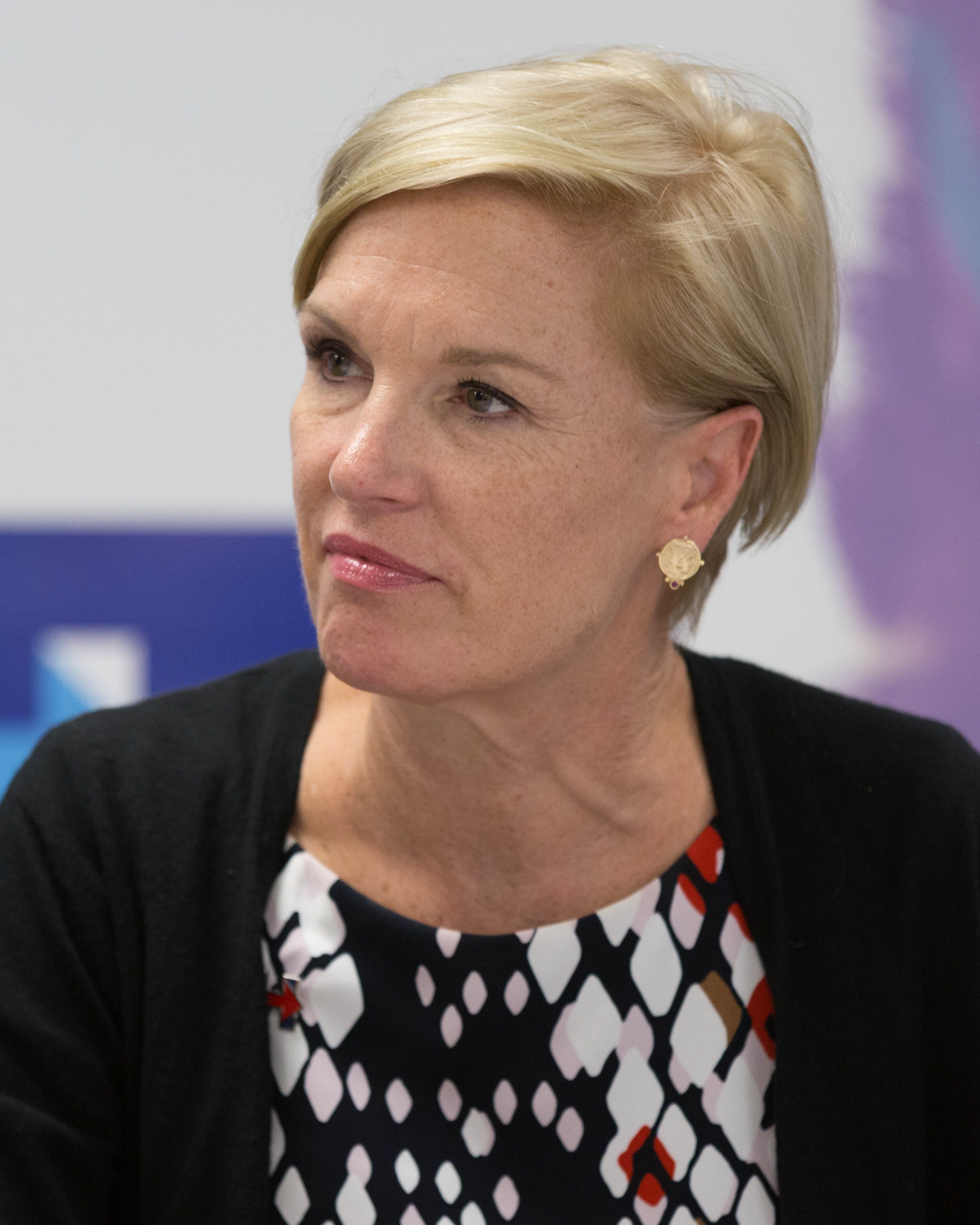
- Richards in 2016

President of Planned Parenthood
- In office February 2006 – April 2018
- Preceded by: Gloria Feldt
- Succeeded by: Leana Wen

Personal details
- Born: July 15, 1957 Waco, Texas, U.S.
- Died: January 20, 2025 (aged 67) New York City, New York, U.S.
- Spouse: Kirk Adams (m. 1985)
- Children: 3
- Parent: Ann Richards (mother)
- Education: Brown University (BA)

Cecile Richards (July 15, 1957 – January 20, 2025) was an American activist who served as the president of both the Planned Parenthood Federation of America and its affiliated Planned Parenthood Action Fund from 2006 to 2018. In 2010, Richards was elected to the Ford Foundation board of trustees. In spring 2019, Richards co-founded Supermajority, a women's political action group.

== Early life ==
Richards was born in Waco, Texas, on July 15, 1957, the daughter of Ann Richards (née Willis), an American politician and activist who served as governor of Texas from 1991 to 1995. Her father, David Richards, practiced law, and built a practice dealing with civil-rights plaintiffs, newspapers, and labor unions. He also won several landmark cases, including a voting-rights lawsuit that went to the Supreme Court. Cecile Richards was raised in Dallas and Austin, Texas. She attended public schools until ninth grade, when she was disciplined for wearing a black armband to protest the Vietnam War. She then attended the progressive St. Stephen's Episcopal School in Austin for the remainder of high school.

In January 1971, at the age of 13, she was named an honorary page to the 62nd Texas State Legislature. At the age of 16, she helped her mother campaign for Sarah Weddington, the attorney who won Roe v. Wade, in her bid for the Texas state legislature.

Richards graduated with a bachelor's degree in history from Brown University (1980).

== Career ==
After graduating college, Richards became a labor organizer for service workers across several states and in Guatemala, running union campaigns for garment workers, nursing home workers, and janitors. When she was 30, she moved back to Texas to help with her mother's campaign for governor. She served on the board of the Ford Foundation, a global private foundation with the mission of advancing human welfare. She was one of the founders of America Votes, a 501(c)4 organization that aims to co-ordinate and promote progressive issues, and served as its president. Before that, she was deputy chief of staff to Nancy Pelosi, the Democratic leader in the U.S. House of Representatives. She also worked at the Turner Foundation. In 1996, she founded the Texas Freedom Network, a Texas organization formed to counter the Christian right. She also served on the board of advisors of Let America Vote, an organization founded by former Missouri Secretary of State Jason Kander that aims to end voter suppression.

Richards became the president of Planned Parenthood in 2006, reinvigorated the group, growing the base of donors and volunteers for more than a decade. Richards stepped down in 2018, and was succeeded by Leana Wen.

=== Supermajority ===
In April 2019, Richards co-founded a new political action group, Supermajority, to educate and train women to further women's political agenda for the 2020 elections. Founded with activists Alicia Garza and Ai-jen Poo, the group hopes to "push politicians to adopt an agenda akin to what Richards called 'a women's new deal'", with issues like "voting rights, gun control, paid family leave, equal pay, and others" viewed as "soft issues", being seen as "issues that impact everyone".

Since women composed the majority of the electorate in the 2018 mid-term election, Supermajority hopes to further this trend, educating women on "basic organizing skills like voter registration", and building a larger platform for female candidates in the 2020 election. Richards said, "[the group will be successful] if 54% of the voters in this country are women, and if we are able to insert into this country the issues that women care about and elect a president who's committed to doing something about them".

=== Writing ===
She contributed the piece "Combating the Religious Right" to the 2003 anthology Sisterhood Is Forever: The Women's Anthology for a New Millennium, edited by Robin Morgan.

In 2018, Richards published her memoir, Make Trouble: Standing Up, Speaking Out, and Finding the Courage to Lead. The memoir discusses her upbringing and career.

== Personal life and death ==
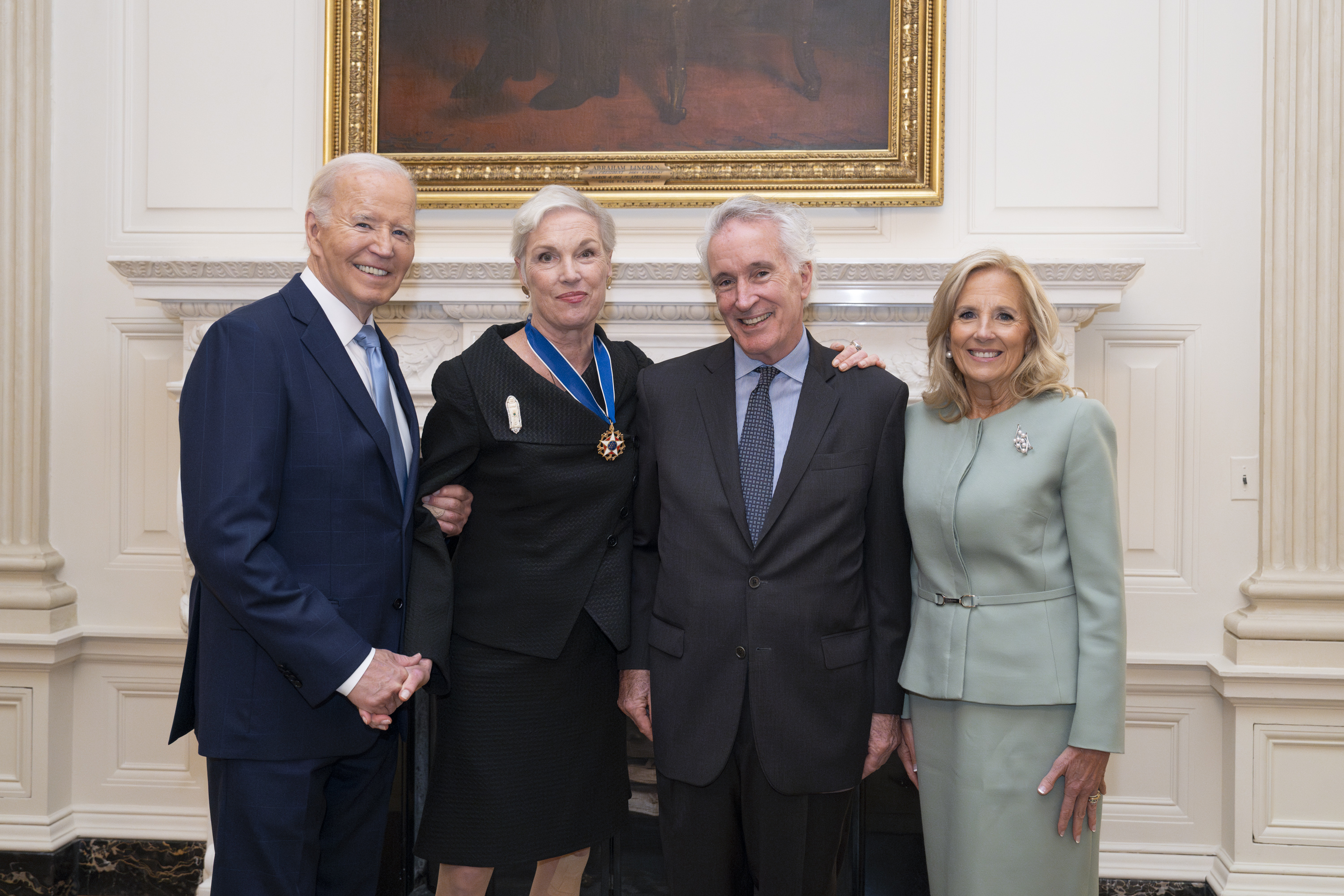
President Joe Biden and First Lady Jill Biden with Cecile Richards and her husband Kirk Adams after awarding Richards the Presidential Medal of Freedom on November 20, 2024, in the White House

Richards was married to Kirk Adams, a labor organizer with the Service Employees International Union, whom she married in 1985. They had three children: Lily, Hannah and Daniel. Their eldest, Lily Adams, served as press secretary for Tim Kaine, later as an advisor of communications for Hillary Clinton's Democratic presidential campaign, and as communications director for Kamala Harris's presidential campaign.

Richards was diagnosed with glioblastoma, an aggressive form of brain cancer, in mid-2023. She died at her home in Manhattan, New York, on January 20, 2025, at the age of 67.

== Awards and honors ==
- 2010 Puffin/Nation Prize for Creative Citizenship
- 2012 Time magazine's 100 Most Influential People in the World
- November 20, 2024, awarded Presidential Medal of Freedom by President Joe Biden at the White House.
