= Jeanne Gauna =

Jeanne Gauna was an activist in New Mexico who worked on a wide array of causes, included environmental justice, labor rights, sexism and police brutality.

== Early life ==
She was born September 26, 1946 in Vaughn, New Mexico. Her parents were Willie and Josephine Gauna. Her sister Eileen won an award titled the Fighting For Justice Reward. Growing up in New Mexico, Gauna made it her life's mission to fight the injustices she and her family faced in New Mexico. Gauna received her education from the University of New Mexico where she earned a Bachelors of Arts degree. She pursued studies in the politics of traditional New Mexican communities, culture, history, and culture

== Personal life ==
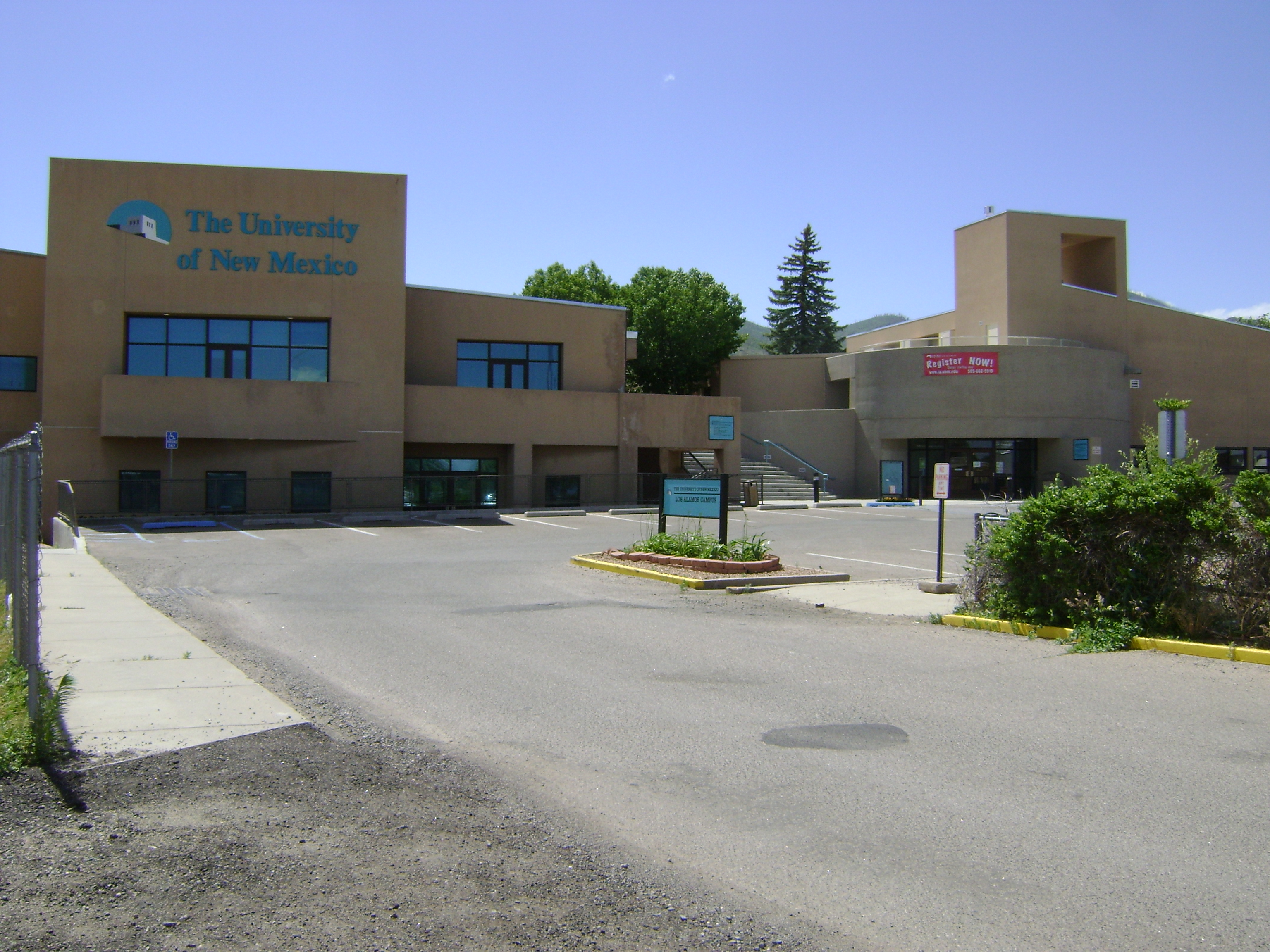
University of New Mexico

Jeanne Gauna had two sons. She died of cancer on February 17, 2003. Gauna had a son Jason with her first husband. She moved to Albuquerque where she married Eric Schmieder with whom she had her son Karlos.

== Career ==
In the 1970s Gauna worked with Richard Moore, director of the regional office of the Children's Foundation as office manager. Later, SWOP gave rise to the Southwest Network for Environmental and Economic Justice (SNEEJ), with Richard Moore as director. This allowed for Gauna to become SWOP's main director.

=== SouthWest Organizing Project ===
After the Children's Foundation was defunded, Gauna and Moore co-directed the SouthWest Organizing Project (SWOP). SWOP is a grassroots organization that worked to end racial and environmental injustice. They worked on police brutality, gender inequality, racism and the environment. SWOP fights against policies and practices that contributed to environmental pollution and the poisoning of low income communities and communities of color.

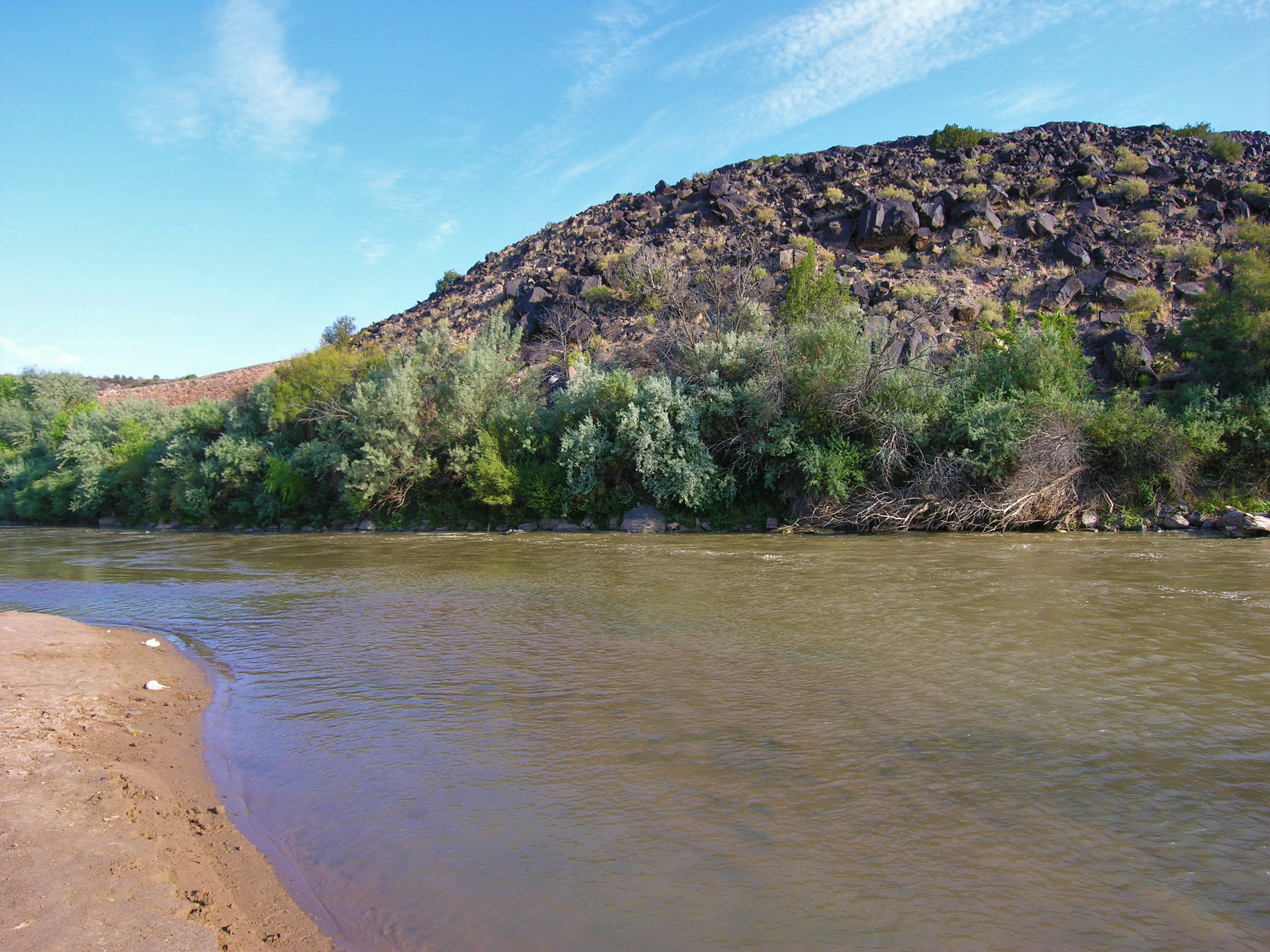
Rio Grande river

In the 1900s, SWOP protested with the Navajo people in Albuquerque for the water rights of the Rio Grande.

Gauna spent her life supporting many organizations such as:

- The Albuquerque Boycott Committee
- Citizens Against Nuclear Threats
- Movimiento Estudiantil Chicano de Aztlán
- NM Public Interest Research Group
- U.S. National Board of Greenpeace U.S.A.
- Board of the Coalition for Environmentally Responsible Economics
- National People of Color Environmental Leadership Summit
- Committee to Stop Grand Jury Abuse
- Committee Against Repression

== Recognition ==
Jeanne Gauna received the following awards:

- Prestigious Bannerman Award for veteran organizers
- The Southwest Public Workers Union Environmental Justice Award
- American Civil Liberties Union Guardian of the Constitution Award
- De Colores Grassroots Leadership Award
