= ARC3 Survey =

Research into sexual misconduct at American college campuses

The ARC3 (Administrator-Researcher Campus Climate Collaborative) Survey is a campus climate survey developed to assess perpetration and victimization of sexual misconduct on college campuses in the United States. In addition to measuring rates of sexual assault on campus, the survey also gathers data on those who are engaging in sexual assault. It was developed by a group of sexual assault researchers and student affairs professionals in response to the White House Task Force to Protect Students from Sexual Assault. The survey is free for college campuses to use. The study has been used to assess both graduate and undergraduate students.

== Background ==
College sexual assault is common. Estimates of the number of women assaulted on college campuses have shown that some 15 to 20 percent of college women report rape or attempted rape during their college career, and that over 50 percent report experiencing some form of unwanted sexual contact. Not only are survivors of sexual violence at an increased risk for anxiety, depression, posttraumatic stress disorder, substance abuse, and various other physical health problems, but they are also at risk of poorer academic performance. Additionally, according to the AAUP Report on Sexual Assault, other academic consequences of sexual assault include: significant declines in academic achievement; impaired ability to carry a normal course load; increased frequency of missing classes; reduced capacity to contribute to the campus community; and an increased likelihood of dropping courses, leaving school, or transferring.

Students in the United States may apply Title IX of the Education Amendments of 1972 in order to successfully sue universities for "indifference to known situations of harassment." In addition, Title IX is used to support initiatives to prevent sexual assault on college campuses in the United States. Because of various federal investigations, many universities turned to surveys and apps that were often expensive, spending "six figures on a product that promised to address the problem."

=== White House Initiative "It's on Us" ===
With the increase of attention on college sexual misconduct, the White House presented on September 19, 2014 the launch of the "It's on Us" Campaign. President Barack Obama and Vice President Joe Biden introduced the campaign by describing the importance of ending sexual assault on college campuses. The "It's on Us" Campaign is leading a pledge to "not be a bystander to the problem [of sexual assault], but to be a part of the solution." The campaign emphasizes the idea that everyone is responsible for taking a stand in ending sexual violence.

The ARC3 Survey was developed in response to the White House initiative in hopes to better evaluate data about sexual misconduct on college campuses.

The ARC3 survey was also created in order to ensure that there was no profit motive behind the campus surveys, many of which have been very expensive for colleges to purchase and implement. Jennifer Freyd, a researcher at the University of Oregon, has been instrumental in spear-heading the ARC3 survey initiative.

== Collaborators ==
This survey is the result of ongoing efforts by student and legal affairs professionals, campus advocates, students, campus law enforcement, and sexual assault and harassment researchers, groups of whom met in Atlanta, Georgia in October 2014 for the Georgia State University Forum on Campus Sexual Assault and in February 2015 in Madison, Wisconsin for the Madison Summit on Campus Climate and Sexual Misconduct. The collaborators who collectively designed the survey and their titles and institutions are listed below:

Collaborator	Title	Institution
Antonia Abbey	Professor of Psychology	Wayne State University
Noël Busch-Armendariz	Professor of Social Work, and director, Institute on Domestic Violence and Sexual Assault	University of Texas at Austin
Jacquelyn Campbell	Professor of Nursing	Johns Hopkins University
Brett Carter	Dean of Students	University of North Carolina at Greensboro
Gretchen Clum	Associate Professor of Public Health	Tulane University
Sarah Cook	Professor of Psychology and Associate Dean, Honors College	Georgia State University
Amalia Corby-Edwards	Senior Legislative and Federal Affairs Officer	American Psychological Association
Lilia Cortina	Associate Professor of Psychology and Women's Studies	University of Michigan
Karol Dean	Dean, School of Social and Behavioral Sciences	Mercy College
Louise Douce	Special Assistant to Vice President of Student Life	Ohio State University
Louise Fitzgerald	Emerita Professor of Psychology and Gender & Women's Studies	University of Illinois at Urbana-Champaign
Bill Flack	Associate Professor of Psychology	Bucknell University
Jennifer Freyd	Professor of Psychology	University of Oregon
Jaray Mazique	Director of Title IX and Compliance	Spelman College
Anne Hedgepeth	Government Relations Manager	American Association of University Women
Kathryn Holland	Doctoral Candidate in Psychology and Women's Studies	University of Michigan
Janet Hyde	Professor of Psychology and Gender & Women's Studies	University of Wisconsin
Mary P. Koss	Regents' Professor of Public Health	University of Arizona
Felicia McGinty	Vice Chancellor for Student Affairs	Rutgers, The State University of New Jersey
Meredith Smith	Lead Title IX Investigator & Deputy Title IX Coordinator	University of Connecticut
Kate Stover	Educational Programmer	Title IX Compliance Institute
Kevin Swartout	Assistant Professor of Psychology	Georgia State University
Jacquelyn White	Emerita Professor of Psychology	University of North Carolina at Greensboro

== Guiding principles ==
According to the ARC3 Survey website hosted by Georgia State University the ARC3 Survey was created with the following principles in mind:

- Inclusiveness, mutual respect, and collaboration
  - Where the voices of researchers, college and university administrators, and students will all be heard.
- Engaging in an iterative and transparent drafting process
  - The authors invite and encourage peer review and revision of the survey.
  - Administrators should give support, feedback and consultation to researchers so that the survey will be as useful and relevant as possible.
  - Scientists in turn should consider the feedback in developing a survey that meets institutional needs.
- Ensuring independence and integrity in research
  - Guided by the ethics of science and recognizing and taking steps to remove the influence of bias.
  - A commitment to use of the best scientific evidence as the foundation of the survey.
  - There is a scientific knowledge base and a transparent scientific process must guide this work if the research is to have integrity and accuracy.
  - Peer reviewed studies are the basis for determining survey content.
- Equal focus on surveying victimization and perpetration
  - Meaningful prevention rests on identifying the reasons sexual misconduct is perpetrated and the environments that foster it. Data that are focused on both victimization and perpetration creates a scientific foundation for administrative work.
- The adoption of a civil rights approach grounded in Title IX
  - Our work focuses on the range of acts that constitute student on student incidents an institution must respond to and process under guidelines of Title IX, the Violence Against Women Act, the Clery Law and other applicable local, state, and federal law and guidelines.
- Framing our efforts with the principles of The Belmont Report
  - Respect for persons: Ensure that students are informed and participate voluntarily.
  - Beneficence: Participation in a campus climate survey is an educational opportunity and an intervention.
- Justice
  - As stated in the Belmont report, address “Who ought to receive the benefits of research and bear its burdens?”
- A sensitivity to the unique issues faced by various diverse populations and higher education institutional types
  - Addressing the intersectionality of identities and the multiple contextual factors affecting risk.

== Survey components ==
The ARC3 Survey takes approximately 30 minutes to complete and has a module-based structure which makes it flexible to campus needs and legislative mandates moving forward, while maintaining validity of measurement. The following is a list of module topics obtained from the ARC3 Website:

Module	Topic
1	POSSIBLE OUTCOMES
2	ALCOHOL USE
3	PEER NORMS
4	PERCEPTIONS OF CAMPUS CLIMATE REGARDING SEXUAL MISCONDUCT
5	SEXUAL HARASSMENT BY FACULTY/STAFF
6	SEXUAL HARASSMENT BY STUDENTS
7	STALKING VICTIMIZATION
8	STALKING PERPETRATION
9	DATING VIOLENCE VICTIMIZATION
10	DATING VIOLENCE PERPETRATION
11	SEXUAL VIOLENCE VICTIMIZATION
12	SEXUAL VIOLENCE PERPETRATION
13	INSTITUTIONAL RESPONSES
14	PEER RESPONSES
15	CONSENT
16	BYSTANDER INTERVENTION
17	CAMPUS SAFETY
18	DEMOGRAPHICS
19	ADDITIONAL INFORMATION
