= Forward Together PAC =

Political action committee

Forward Together
- Forward Together PAC
- Formation: July 6, 2005; 21 years ago
- Type: Leadership PAC
- Registration no.: FEC: C00412791
- Locations: Alexandria, Virginia, United States; Washington D.C., United States
- Honorary Chairman: Mark Warner

Forward Together PAC is a leadership political action committee based in Alexandria, Virginia. The Committee's Honorary Chair is current Democratic U.S. Senator and former Governor of Virginia Mark Warner.

Until October 2006, Warner was believed to be actively pursuing the Presidency for 2008, and this PAC supports many positions that Warner advocates, such as fundraising for New Democrats and Blue Dog Democrats. Most label Warner as a New Democrat.

In September 2006, Warner launched Forward Together's Youthroots, a Web-based youth outreach effort that hoped to continue the trend of increasing youth turnout.

During the 2006 election cycle, Forward Together PAC donated over $650,000 to federal candidates.
