= Southwest Network for Economic and Environmental Justice =

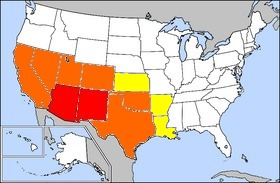
Map showing the southwestern region of the United States.

The Southwest Network for Economic and Environmental Justice (SNEEJ) is a multi-racial, grassroots coalition based in the southwestern United States. SNEEJ was established in the 1990s by Richard Moore in Albuquerque, New Mexico, during a People of Color Regional Activist Dialogue on Environmental Justice set up by the Southwest Organizing Project (SWOP). SNEEJ was formed to address systemic injustices affecting marginalized communities during the time with a focus on addressing environmental justice issues and economic disparities present within communities of color. Major changes of SNEEJ centered around workplace safety, environmental health, and training within local communities around environmental injustices to demand accountability and recognize action needed. The Southwest Network for Economic and Environmental Justice worked alongside with other coveninings to stay in strong contact and be allied in these forces, having the same goal and fighting system-wide issues. Richard Moore linked more than 70 community groups in 6 southwestern states and Mexico. SNEEJ became a leader in fighting environmental injustices.

== Origins ==
SNEEJ was started in April 1990 during a People of Color Regional Activist Dialogue on Environmental Justice set up by the Southwest Organizational Project (SWOP). This reflected the broader U.S. environmental justice movement, which grew from concerns that pollution, hazardous waste, and other environmental harms disproportionately affected low-income communities and communities of color. Richard Moore first started his contributions to his community in Albuquerque, but soon realized that the environmental injustices occurring in low-income neighborhoods were a country-wide issue. Richard Moore served as the Executive Director of SNEEJ from 1993 to 2010 before he took on the role of Senior Advisor. He had also been a founding member of SWOP but left the organization in the 1990s. SNEEJ was formed in response to a growing concern for the economic and environmental exploitation of communities of color, Indigenous peoples, and low-income populations in the southwest of the United States. The network was founded as a coalition of grassroots organizations in the southwest, but later grew to include organizations from Northern Mexico, seeking to challenge present inequalities while also providing a platform for collaboration and support amongst those involved. SNEEJ has worked on issues including the usage of harmful pesticides in agricultural communities, lead poisoning, landfill regulations, and how they affect marginalized communities of color. Through its work, the network sought to bring together organizations and individuals from diverse racial, cultural, and social communities to create and advocate for solutions to environmental and economic issues. SNEEJ also provides training and leadership development opportunities and resources. In a letter addressed to David Chatfield on May 24, 1990 from Richard Moore, he expressed the needed support for training and resources for the organization to speak and address environmental issues for themselves. Environmental organizations were growing frustrations from a lack of diversification in leadership roles throughout the environmental justice movement. Richard Moore believed that the environmental movement was multiracial and must work hand-in-hand with civil and human rights to create a widespread and inclusive change.

== Background / Environmental Justice Context ==
Environmental injustice in the United States has been linked to the disproportionate exposure of low-income communities to pollution. Environmental inequality and injustice are directly correlated to underlying racism in communities, which follow hand in hand with urban development decisions. Banzhaf touches on the topic housing market sorting, which describes that individuals will choose where to live based on personal preferences and income. This leads to a sorting effect where lower-income households will be more likely to live in the same areas, where lower environmental quality is prevalent. Land value is determined by the environmental qualities, like clean water and air. Research supports the ideas of the organization, SNEEJ, that neighborhoods of color are exposed to more toxic waste than white, higher class neighborhoods. SNEEJ works to address these inequalities that marginalized communities face for environmental challenges. There are instances where policies implemented fall short on the intended outcome. Research suggests that environmental policies added in at the state level can be seen as symbolic actions, versus creating a positive outcome for affected communities. Environmental justice outcome can have adverse effects, reinforcing challenges that SNEEJ face in creating long-term solutions or support with lacking policies.

== Key work ==
=== Environmental Protection Agency accountability campaign ===
Seal of the United States Environmental Protection Agency

SNEEJ originally launched its accountability campaign against the Environmental Protection Agency (EPA) on July 31, 1991. To launch this campaign, SNEEJ sent letters to the EPA regional offices of Dallas, Denver, and San Francisco. These letters detailed examples of the EPA's inaction to environmental injustices harmful to people of color. The letters also requested a meeting between the EPA and SNEEJ and new policies to address the EPA's past discrimination. In response to the letter the EPA eventually agreed to negotiate with the network. Publicity on the effects of pesticides and industrial pollution on the surrounding communities put pressure on the EPA to address the environmental justice concerns. As a result of the actions of the SNEEJ, the EPA was forced to address the issues of environmental injustice with increased enforcement of regulations on communities of color as well as a reexamination of U.S. environmental policy. The network's campaign also led to the creation of the National Environmental Justice Advisory Committee to the EPA. The advisory committee was chaired by SNEEJ founding member, Richard Moore, and established an official voice for SNEEJ and other grassroots organizations. Scholars have described environmental justice organizations such as SNEEJ as participants in deliberative decision-making, using negotiation, agency meetings, and policy discussions to push government agencies toward greater accountability.

=== Support of Indigenous American groups ===
SNEEJ's campaign against the misuse of Indigenous land was a joint effort between the network and Indigenous Americans. Originally, this campaign began as an education project of the network but grew from there as SNEEJ began working with Indigenous tribes on important environmental justice issues impacting southwestern Indigenous Americans. SNEEJ helped support the Western Shoshone end missile testing, the Diné (Navajo) end mining by Peabody Coal, and the Havasupai in their fight against uranium mining. Over the years, the network has continued to work with indigenous groups on other related issues. A letter was sent on May 24, 1990 to David Chatfield, expressing the annexation of Indigenous Acoma Pueblo ancestral lands, which was proved to be a successful economic development. Indigenous peoples have long been central to the environmental justice movement, advocating for land rights, environmental protection, and resistance to resource exploitation affecting their communities.

== Richard Moore ==
Richard Moore is an environmental justice advocate and leader. In the 1960s, Moore moved to New Mexico, where he helped to form the Southwest Organizing Project (SWOP) with Jeanne Guana; he served as co-director. In the 1990s, after leaving SWOP, Moore became a founding member of SNEEJ. Since the formation of the SNEEJ, Moore has continued to advocate for environmental justice and other issues affecting marginalized communities.
